= Trinchera Cave Archeological District =

Archaeological site in Colorado, United States

- U.S. National Register of Historic Places
- U.S. Historic district
- Location within Colorado Location within the United States
- Location: Along Trinchera Creek, 8.5 miles (13.7 km) north of Trinchera
- Nearest city: Trinchera
- Coordinates: 37°9′58″N 104°0′53″W
- Area: 460 acres (1.9 km^{2})
- Architectural style: Stacked stone enclosure
- NRHP reference No.: 01001120
- Added to NRHP: October 22, 2001

The Trinchera Cave Archeological District (5LA9555) is an archaeological site in Las Animas County, Colorado with artifacts primarily dating from 1000 BC to AD 1749, although there were some Archaic period artifacts found. The site was added to the National Register of Historic Places in 2001 and is located on State Trust Lands.

== Geography ==
Trinchera Cave is located within the Trinchera Creek canyon in south central Colorado, east of Interstate 25. The climate zones and topography vary significantly in the 3,147 square mile Trinchera data analysis area (State of Colorado). Elevations range from 5,370 to 14,345 feet (1,637 to 4,372 m), the lowest being at the San Francisco Creek to the height at Blanca Peak. Between the two points are low rolling hills, valleys, ridges, steep mountain slopes and cliffs. At the lowest elevation there is less than 6 inches of precipitation per year; The mountainous areas receive 20 or more inches of precipitation per year, primarily in the form of snow. The habitat supports elk and deer populations.

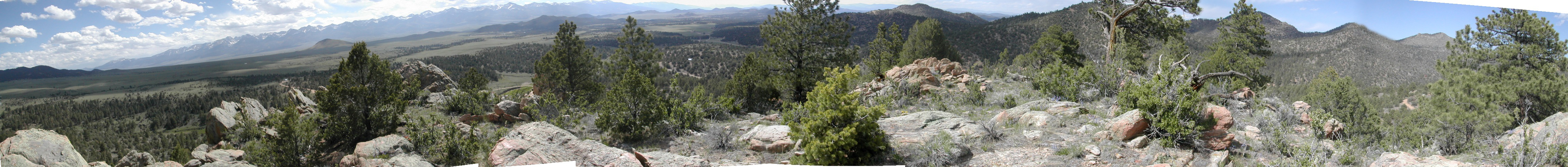
Sangre de Cristo Range looking west

== History ==
Archaeological data indicates that there were people who inhabited or camped at the site from the late Archaic cultural period, Sopris phase, Apishapa culture complex, and late prehistoric periods, which spanned a period from several thousand years BC to AD 1749.

=== Archaic period - 5850-3050 BC ===
People of the Archaic period were hunters of smaller game, such as deer, antelope and rabbits, and gatherers of wild plants. The people moved seasonally to hunting and gathering sites. Late in the Archaic period, about AD 200-500, corn was introduced into the diet and pottery-making became an occupation for storing and caring food.

Large corner notched points from the Archaic age are artifacts found at the site and akin to the Texas Ellis points or Denver area Magic Mountain site points found in Zone B. The presence of the points could show a relationship to the Basketmaker culture of New Mexico and Arizona, one of 17 such sites in southern Colorado.

=== Sopris phase – AD 1000-1250 ===
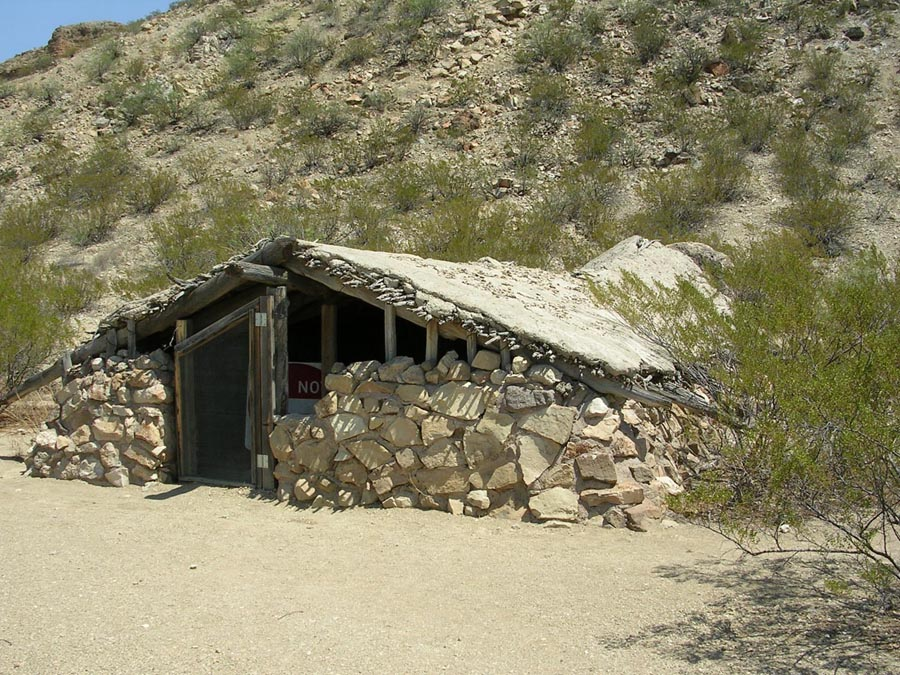
Example of a jacal structure, Big Bend National Park, Texas

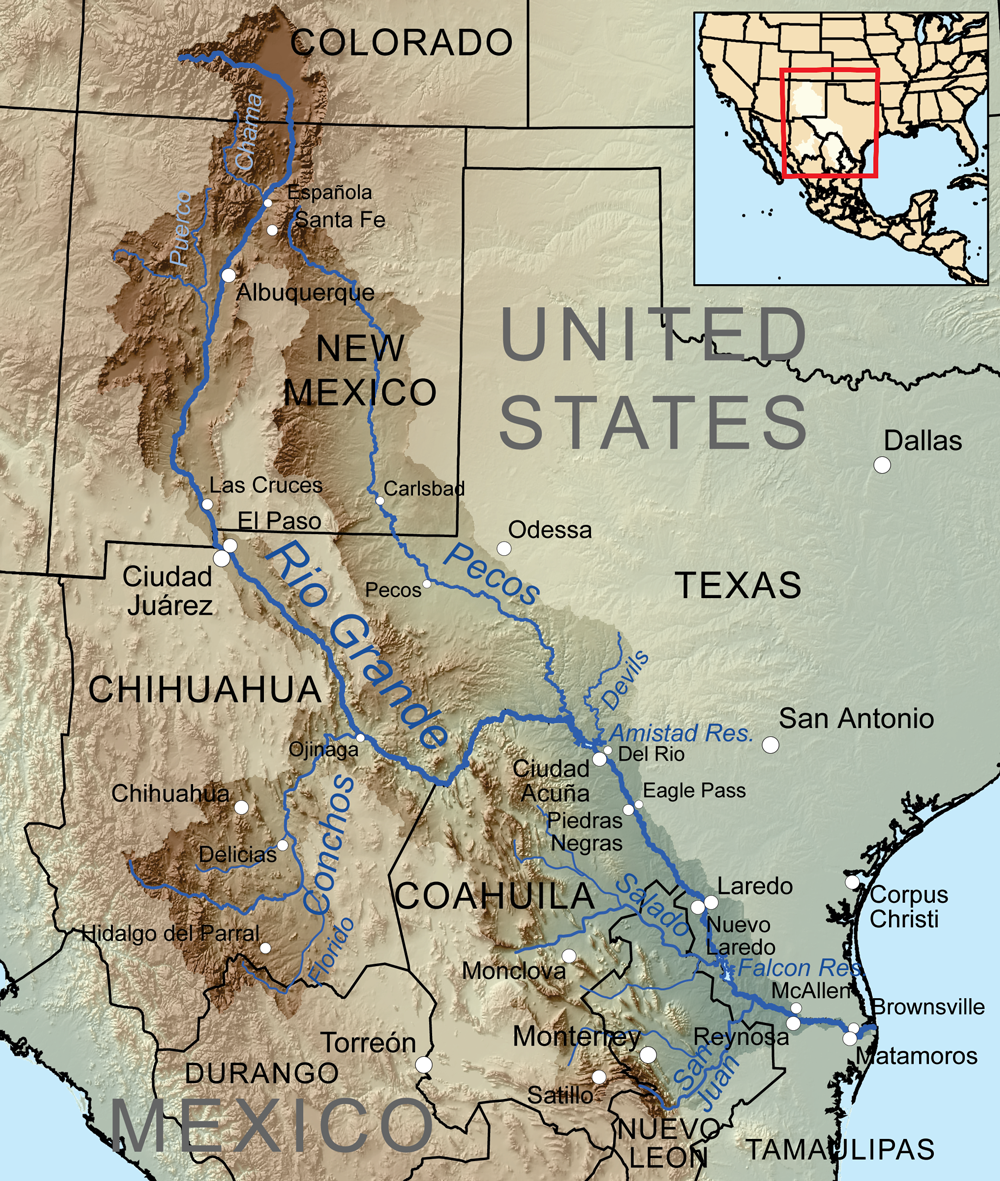
Watershed of the Rio Grande

Sopris phase was an Upper Rio Grande hunter-gatherer culture that followed the Archaic period, influenced by pueblo people, such as the Taos Pueblo, and trade in the Upper Rio Grande.

Santa Fe black-on-white pottery and Taos gray pottery were found at the second oldest level at the rock shelter. Also at that level was a greater percentage of corner-notched projectile that was found in the oldest level. The research and dating of items of this period indicate dates from AD 1100 to 1350, likely in the 1200s, and indicate a trading relationships with people of the American southwest.

=== Panhandle culture ===
Panhandle culture is a prehistoric culture of the southern High Plains during the Middle Ceramic Period from AD 1200-1400. Panhandle sites are primarily in the panhandle and west central Oklahoma and the northern half of the Texas Panhandle. Antelope Creek focus is the primary, and to some the only, cultural tradition of the Panhandle culture. The Optima focus was defined for sites in west central Oklahoma, but after further study, these sites were defined as Antelope Creek focus. In 1975 Robert G. Campbell defined the Apishapa of southeastern Colorado's Chaquaqua Plateau as a Panhandle culture, which is disputed by other archaeologists. Most of the sites are centered around the Canadian River or its tributaries, primarily Antelope Creek and also Cottonwood Creek, Dixon Creek, Tarbox Creek and also on the Archie King Ranch.

Distinguishing characteristics of the Panhandle culture are:

- Great similarity to the Central Plains complexes
- Some, but much less, evidence of trading or influence of Southwestern pueblo cultures
- Single or multi-roomed stone structures

Just above the Sopris level were remains of a Jacal structure. This level appears to contain a Panhandle culture influence, based upon the presence of artifacts typical of the Antelope Creek Phase and Stamper cord-marked pottery.

The Apishapa Phase, from AD 1000-1400, was identified by archaeologist Robert G. Campbell to be an outgrowth of the Panhandle culture. The Apishapa distinctions included that they sometimes lived in stone or slab constructed structures, made cord-wrapped pottery and used smaller projectile points; Unlike other Plains tribes, they did not use tools made of bison bones. They were a tradition of hunter gatherers who sometimes farmed. The people of the Apishapa phase lived in northern New Mexico or southern Colorado in rock shelters, single or multi-room stone or slab structures or in campsites, generally in protected areas near flowing water. Artifacts from this phase include a wide range of tools, cord-wrapped pottery and baskets. The initial reference point for the term was an archaeological site in the Lower Apishapa canyon.

=== Discovery ===
Willard Louden, (Note: Unless William has a relative named "Willard C. Louden", Louden's name is sometimes stated as "Willard C. Louden") a historian, geologist, and rancher, discovered the cave when he flew overhead the area in 1947. With Ruth Henritze, Louden dug for artifacts. The two individually published books about archaeology including:

- Penetente Architecture at the Mouth of Long Canyon, Las Animas County, Colorado - Stephen K. Ireland, Ruth H. Henritze. (1973)
- Las Animas Archaeological and Historical Site Survey - Willard C. Louden, Stephen K. Ireland. (1974)
- Granada and Holly Archaeological Site Survey - Willard C. Louden, Stephen K. Ireland. (1974)

In 1984 the Louden-Henritze Archeology Museum at the Trinidad State Junior College was dedicated to Richard and Willard Louden and Ruth Henritze.

=== Archaeology ===
==== Cave description ====
The cave, approximately 30 by 8 metres (98 by 26 ft) under a 8 metres (26 ft) overhang, is surrounded by Dakota formation sandstone and sits on a Purgatoire shale formation floor. Within the rock shelter there were previously walls, reportedly built with sandstone blocks, estimated to be 1.5 metres (4.9 ft) thick. Adjacent to the shelter is a creek.

The shelter stays cool in the summer due to the overhang and is warmed by the sun in the winter.

==== Artifacts and other information ====
Trinchera Cave shares some similarities with a couple of other archaeological sites in eastern Colorado. Trinchera Cave, Franktown Cave and Chamber Cave, all showed significant evidence of residence, including a wealth of perishable items. The Trinchera and Chamber Cave sites, though, are located in the Arkansas River basin and connected with the people of the southern plains. Franktown Cave is located in the South Platte River basin, near Denver, Colorado. The latest inhabitants of the cave were the Apache and Comanche tribes.

Excavations were performed between the 1950s and 1970s, finding a similar variety of perishable items that were found at the Franktown Cave. The collection was taken and stored at the neighboring Trinidad State Junior College, but the information about the perishable items collection has not yet tabulated and published.

==== Excavation and studies ====
Date	Name	Comments
1954–1957	Hal Chase and Herb Dick, professors at the Trinidad State Junior College.	Conducted excavations of the site.
1974	Carol Simpson	Studied the site and prepared a thesis for her master's degree.
1997–1999	Program for Avocational Archaeological Certification (PAAC) volunteers	A survey was conducted of the Trinchera Creek canyon system, on which Trinchera Cave is located, by volunteers trained to perform surveys. They documented 57 sites, 18 isolated finds, with most of the artifacts dating after AD 1500. The hunter-gatherer artifacts included non-micaceous plain pottery, lithic tools made from Alibates and obsidian chert, and diagnostic tools which were similar to items of southern plains people.
1999	Michael Nowak and students, Colorado College	Excavated the site to record and radiocarbon date items at the site.
By 2003	Possibly Smithsonian Institution	Geodetic, magnetic, resistivity, and seismic surveys to locate the walls of the Apishapa "jackal" structure, which had been reported from the 1974 excavation, but backfilled as to not be visible or found in studies subsequent to 1974.
2018-2019	Ryan Baker	Studied how portable and bedrock ground stone technology are related to regional hunter-gatherer adaptation and if these relationships changed through time. His research provides insight into how the prehistoric inhabitants of the area articulated with the landscape through their subsistence system.

== Louden-Henritze Museum of Archaeology ==
The Louden-Henritze Museum of Archaeology, located in Trinidad on the grounds of the Trinidad State Junior College, replica of the Trinchera Cave rockshelter exhibits examples of items made by pre-historic people, including pottery, projectile points, and perishable items made from plants, such as braided ropes, grass mats and yucca sandals. The dry, protected cave preserved the perishable items.

== See also ==
- List of prehistoric sites in Colorado

== Notes ==
William Louden and Richard Louden, William's son, worked together on the publications. Sometimes their names are combined to form "Willard".
