= Franktown Cave =

Archaeological site in Colorado, United States

- U.S. National Register of Historic Places
- Colorado State Register of Historic Properties
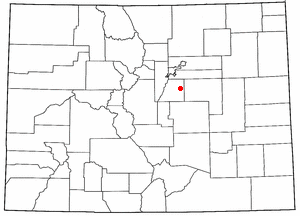
- Franktown, Douglas County, Colorado Cave
- Nearest city: Franktown, Colorado
- NRHP reference No.: 05001561
- CSRHP No.: 5DA.272
- Added to NRHP: 2006

Franktown Cave is an archeological site in the U.S. state of Colorado, located 25 miles (40 km) south of Denver on the north edge of the Palmer Divide. It is the largest rock shelter documented on the Palmer Divide, which contains artifacts from many prehistoric cultures. Prehistoric hunter-gatherers occupied Franktown Cave intermittently for 8,000 years beginning about 6400 BC The site held remarkable lithic and ceramic artifacts, but it is better known for its perishable artifacts, including animal hides, wood, fiber and corn. Material goods were produced for their comfort, task-simplification and religious celebration. There is evidence of the site being a campsite or dwelling as recently as AD 1725.

== Geography ==
Franktown Cave is a rock shelter 198 feet (60 m) above Willow Creek, a tributary of Cherry Creek that flows into the South Platte River at Denver, Colorado, 25 miles to the north. It is more than 6,000 feet (1,800 m) in elevation.

Situated on Palmer Divide, which separates the South Platte River basin from the Arkansas River basin, Franktown Cave is its largest documented rock shelter in the area. Palmer Divide is an east–west ridge in central Colorado that runs perpendicular to the Rocky Mountains between Denver and Colorado Springs and east to Limon, Colorado. Monument Hill is the highest point of the divide, at about 7,500 feet (2,300 m).

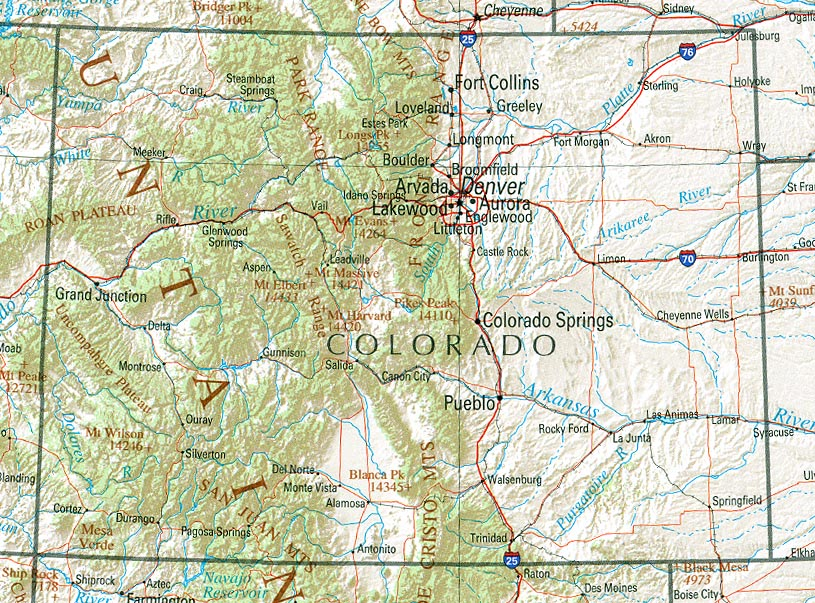
South Platte basin (ne) and Arkansas River basin (se). Franktown is slightly east of Castle Rock.

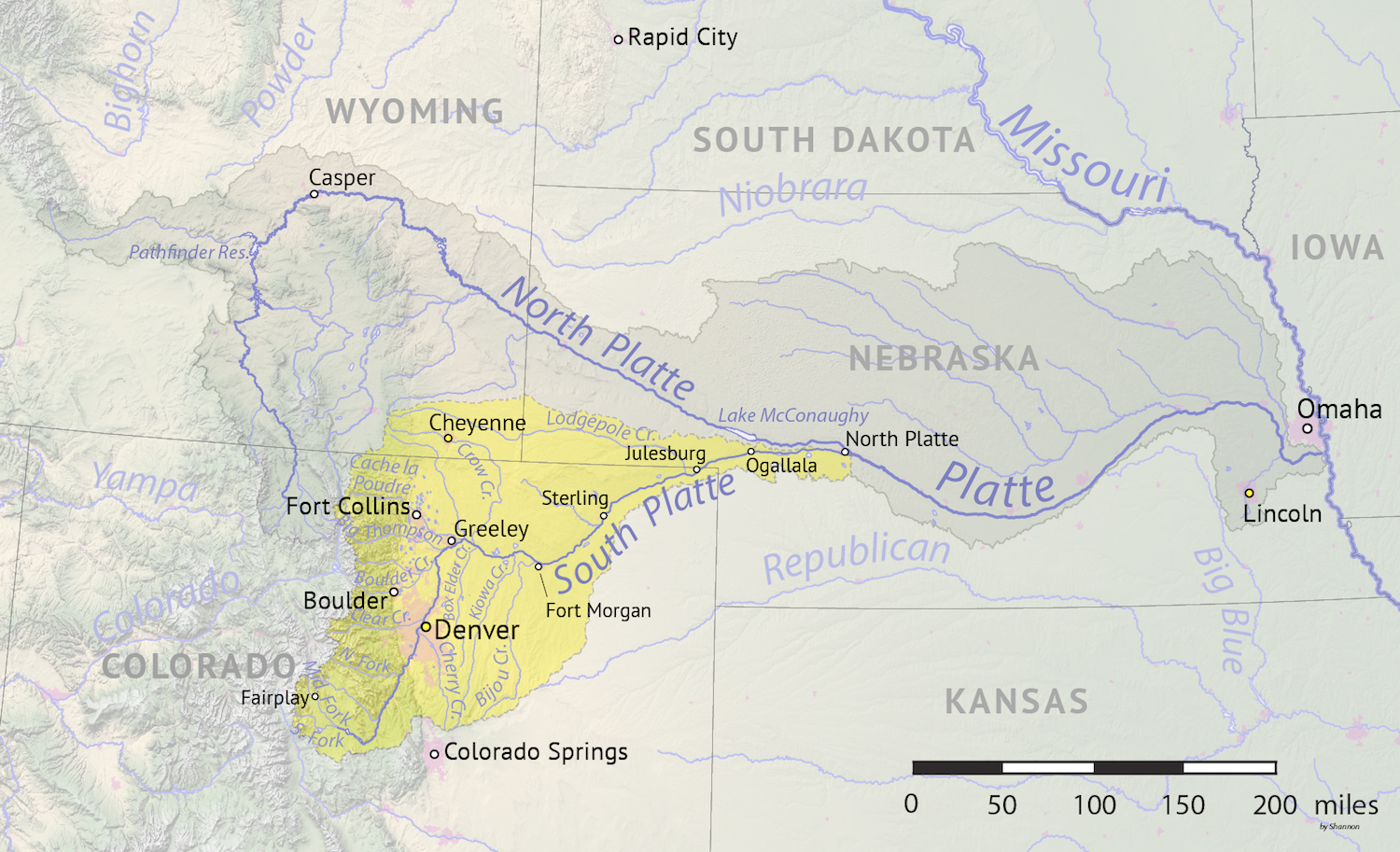
South Platte River watershed. Cherry Creek flows off of the Palmer Divide northwest to the South Platte River in Denver.

The cave was created when water eroded the soft, water soluble layers of Dawson Arkose formation through seeps below a thick, hard shelf of Castle Rock Conglomerate. The area provides two key raw materials that were used for tool-making:

- Microcrystalline rock in white chalcedony, light yellow and caramel that was formed from petrified wood during the Paleocene period. Projectile points and small bifaces were made from microcrystalline rock.
- Wall Mountain tuff rhyolite from the Oligocene age for flake tools.

Near the rock shelter, spring-fed streams traverse a land of scrub oak, plains grassland and open ponderosa pine forest.

== Physical characteristics ==
Franktown Cave is the largest rockshelter documented in the Palmer Divide. The overhang is about 131 feet (40 meters) wide, and measures 65.6 feet (20.0 meters) between the dripline and the rear wall in the northern half of the shelter. This is where most of the excavations were placed and the majority of the artifacts were found. The shelter is naturally divided into a lower and upper shelter. The upper shelter is on the south side and the lower shelter is on the north side. Very little documented excavation has occurred in the upper shelter, because it has thin sediment cover over the bedrock and is periodically saturated with water. Very few artifacts have been found in the upper shelter.

== History ==
Prehistoric cultural periods of eastern Colorado are traditionally identified as: Paleo-Indians at the earliest, Archaic, Ceramic and Protohistoric phases. Evidence of Franktown Cave habitation began with the early Archaic period (about 6400 BC) and continued through each of the intervening cultural periods to AD 1725.

=== Archaic periods ===
People of the Archaic period moved seasonally to gather wild plants and hunt game, such as deer, antelope and rabbits. Late in the Archaic period, about AD 200–500, corn was introduced into the diet and pottery was made for storing and carrying food.

The early, middle and late Archaic periods are all represented at the Franktown cave. The early period was marked by a nomadic hunter-gatherer lifestyle in the mountains and foothills, adapted to smaller game and greater reliance on gathering wild plants for food than their Paleo-Indian ancestors. During this period new stone tools were created to process and prepare plants for meals. Gilmore submits that bison antiquus, the primary source of food for the Paleo-Indian, became extinct due to increasingly warm and arid climate changes of the Holocene Altithermal period [a warm period about 9,000 to 5,000 years ago]. To survive people adapted by hunting smaller game and gathering plants, seeds, and nuts.

As of 2005, Franktown Cave is the only well documented rockshelter site to have evidence of middle Archaic occupation on the Palmer Divide. Based upon archaeological evidence, it appears that mountain people had longer transitional periods through the Archaic and Ceramic periods than those on the Plains. Franktown Cave residents who were adapted to the mountain culture, were also slow in integrating bow and arrow technology and other advancements.

=== Ceramic periods ===
The Early Ceramic, or Woodland, period began in the Plains about AD 1, distinguished by the introduction of the cordwrapped pottery and the bow and arrow. People also began to live in small settlements.

At Franktown, Early Ceramic artifacts include a pottery fragments, a fragment of a coiled basket similar to the earlier periods, and a small corner-notched point - which seems to indicate that the uptake of new technology was slower here than at some other sites during the Early Ceramic period.

Artifacts from AD 780–1290, the middle Ceramic period, include small, distinctive side-notched projectile points, clothing, charcoal, potsherds, a sinew and twig net, and corn cobs. The sinew and twig net is similar to hoops used for several Native American nations' games. Franktown artifacts from the Archaic period reflect the influence of the southern Apishapa culture of the Arkansas basin and the Upper Republican plains people of the South Platte basin in northeastern Colorado and northwestern Kansas. The pottery has the conical shape of Plains Woodland pottery and the cord-markings and rims of Upper Republican pottery.

Population size and mobility changed during the Archaic periods. The number of early Ceramic period sites increased, reflecting an increase in population. By the middle Ceramic phase, there was a marked decrease in the number of sites. People stayed in one place for shorter periods of time and were part of smaller and more mobile groups.

=== Protohistory ===
The groups of people during this period became much more diverse, were more likely to settle in a location or a couple of locations, cultivate food, domesticate animals, make pottery and baskets, and perform ceremonial rituals. Artifacts from 1540 to 1860, the latest prehistoric period, include corn cobs, arrow points and what appear to be Dismal River (Note: Dismal River is an archaeological site in western Kansas and eastern Colorado near the Olsen-Chubbuck Bison Kill Site) Gray ceramic fragments. It is believed that the people of the Dismal River culture were Apache Native Americans. While the Middle Ceramic period reflected a significant decrease in population, it appears as if there was an upswing in eastern Colorado population during the Protohistoric period.

=== Archaeology ===
==== Rock shelter description ====
The rock shelter, sheltered from extreme precipitation and temperature extremes, faced east. It is the largest documented Palmer Divide rock shelter as of 2005, measuring 40 feet (12 m) wide by 20 feet (6.1 m) at its deepest point. At the front edge of the cave, large rocks provided a protecting barrier. There is a lower level on the southern portion of the cave and another several yards higher on the northern side. The southern portion of the cave was dry which preserved most of the excavated items. The upper level had a water seep and few artifacts were found there.

==== Artifacts ====
More than 4,000 artifacts were recovered from Franktown cave in the 1940s and 1950s. They can be divided into four categories. 2,180 chipped stone artifacts were excavated. This includes projectile points and fragments. 234 groundstone artifacts were recovered, and 862 potsherds were recovered as well. Potsherds include cord marked and plain wares. 351 perishable artifacts were excavated. This includes fibers, animal hide, bones, and wood. 791 ecofacts were recovered as well. Ecofacts such as corn and other plant remains, as well as, animal remains, shells and wood. Perishable artifacts and ecofacts are almost completely unknown from sites in the Platte River Basin, and the quantity and variety of the artifacts found is unmatched in the northeastern part of the state.

Examination of the ceramic vessels show that they were made of patches of clay which were then bonded and strengthened using a paddle and anvil technique. This technique is common on Plains sites. It was also found that some of the materials the pottery was made from were local materials. The analysis of the pottery reflects that there was a more intensive occupation of Franktown Cave at the end of the Early Ceramic and the beginning of the Middle Ceramic.

Research into the woven materials indicates technical affinities with peoples to the South and Southwest during the early to middle Archaic transition. Such woven materials include sandals. It was found that different types of sandals were made for the winter and the summer. A more complex sandal with straps meant to hold grass socks were used in the cooler months, while a lighter sandal was used in the warmer months.

Hide used for the production of clothing were found in the faunal remains. There were a high number of bison bone and other large fauna. The presence of rodent bones, snares and rabbit hide robes suggests that small game was also important. Another perishable artifact found was a moccasin, which was worn from use. AMS dates on the moccasin suggest that it was discarded sometime between AD 980 and 1160. The lithic technology suggests extensive reliance on the locally available petrified wood, rhyolite, and quartzite. This pattern of heavy reliance on local raw materials holds to other sites in the Palmer Divide area.

Corn may have been significant to people living in Franktown Cave in different ways at different times. People first began using corn at Franktown Cave in the transition from the Early Ceramic to the Middle Ceramic era. During the Middle Ceramic the climate was wetter and milder, and the human population in the area was higher.

Excavations were conducted intermittently since the 1940s focused primarily on the southern, lower level of the cave. 4,000 pre-historic items were found at the site, 2,180 of which were chipped stone artifacts. The table below shows the artifacts found by cultural period and period of time, dated by Accelerator Mass Spectrometry (AMS) and Radiocarbon dating.

Cultural Period	Component Age / Contributing Dates	Baskets and ceramics	Clothing	Corn / plant	Stone	Other
Early Archaic; 6400-3800 BC	6400-3800 BC				Projectile points	
Middle Archaic; 3800-1250 BC	3350-2470 BC	Coiled basket	Sandal, rabbit hide robe			
Late Archaic; AD 1250 - 150	AD 130-420					Charcoal
Early Ceramic; AD 150-1150	AD 660-800	Coiled basket, early ceramic sherd				
Middle Ceramic; AD 1150-1540	AD 720-1290	Middle ceramic sherd, plain bowl sherd	Legging, moccasin	Corn cob		Charcoal, Sinew/twig net
Protohistoric; AD 1540-1860	AD 1280-1950			Corn cob, corn kernel	Dismal River sherd	

Franktown Cave is similar to Trinchera Cave Archeological District and Chamber Cave, all of which showed significant evidence of residence, including a wealth of perishable items. The Trinchera and Chamber Cave sites are located south of Franktown Cave in the Arkansas River basin and were influenced by the people of the southern Great Plains.

==== Artifact counts and description by category ====
The counts of artifacts by category are: (Note: Trade by the ancient Native American is suggested by the presence of catlinite pipe pieces both at the Franktown Cave and Roxborough sites. Catlinite is indigenous to Minnesota.)

Category	Count	Description of items
Chipped stone artifacts	2,180	Stone artifacts, including 160 projectile points and projectile point fragments, similar to those found in the Mount Albion complex and Magic Mountain sites (MM3). (Note: The Mount Albion complex was an Early Archaic culture of the Plains from about 4050 to 3050 BC, particularly distinguished by their Mount Albion corner-notched projectile. Magic Mountain, in the western foothills near Denver, and Mount Albion were both similar or related to the Albion Boarding House phase. The Mount Albion/Magic Mountain-like points found at the Franktown cave were from a period prior to 3350 BC.)
Ground stone	234	
Potsherds	862	Cordmarked and plain potsherds
Perishable artifacts	351	Baskets, cordage, stitched hide, weaving tools, a moccasin and woven yucca sandals, rabbit fur robe, a sinew net, digging sticks, arrow and atlatl foreshafts, and other items made of bone and wood.
Ecofacts, meaning evidence of ancient environments	791	Bundles of grass, reeds, yucca fiber, cactus pads, and pine needles. Corn cobs and kernels, animal bone, shell and wood. Animal bones found were those of larger mammals like bison, deer and elk. There were also bones for cotton rat, pack rat, porcupine, prairie dog, rabbit turkey, and weasel.
Total	4,418	Perhaps there were duplicates, such as animal bone, fiber, wood, etc.

==== Excavation and studies ====
Franktown Cave Excavations and Studies
Date	Name	Comments
1942	Hugh Capps, a graduate of the University of Denver	The first professional excavation. The collection of 208 excavated items were donated to the University of Denver Department of Anthropology
1949	Professor Arnold Withers, University of Denver Department of Anthropology	Excavation, creation a map of the rock shelter interior
1952	Professor Arnold Withers, University of Denver Department of Anthropology	Excavation of a total of 1,779 items, creation a map of the rock shelter interior
1956–57	Gerold Thompson, graduate student; Arnold Withers	Excavation of 1,292 items, integration with earlier University of Denver findings, creation of a plane table map of the site and began a report, but was unable to complete them due to his armed services commitment.
1976	Dr. Sarah Nelson, University of Denver Department of Anthropology	A one-day site investigation that included location and collection about 570 remaining items and creation of photographs and drawings of the site.
2003	National Science Foundation grant, presumably to the University of Denver	Analysis and dating of perishable items.

Franktown Cave has been excavated for the past fifty years. Hugh O. Capp Jr. was the first to excavate Franktown Cave in 1942. He worked on the north end of the cave. He left the University of Denver with the artifacts in paper sacks, along with his report and all his sketches and photographs. Unfortunately, his report has never been found. Arnold Withers was next to excavate the cave. Withers first excavated in 1949 then again in 1952. The only remaining notes associated with these excavations are a map by Gilbert Wenger, which shows the locations of each “Stratitest” and the test pits, and a stratigraphic profile drawn by David Breternitz. Withers never wrote a report of his finds at Franktown Cave.

Gerold “Tommy” Thompson was the next to excavate Franktown Cave in 1956 and 1957. He recorded a great deal about his excavation. Thompson recovered a sandal and cordage during his excavations. He analyzed the sandal and determined that there were at least two types of sandals. Winter sandals which had more complex straps and a grass sock, and a summer sandal with simpler straps and no grass sock. Charles W. Manz, analyzed 500 pieces of lithic debitage, waste flakes from the manufacture of stone tools in the Franktown Cave collection in 1973. He found that 40% of the debitage showed evidence of breakage after deposition and bag wear. This suggests breakage after collection due to rough or improper handling. His study indicated that people at Franktown Cave mainly used expedient tools from the locally available raw materials.

Sarah M. Nelson and Sarah Studenmund collaborated on a paper and found that the pottery from Franktown cave can all be considered a single type. They found no statistical difference between the cord-marked and smooth pottery, except for the presence or absence of the marks.

The site has also been subject to excavations before the 1940s by local Boy Scouts and has been subject to looting over time.

=== Historical significance ===
Franktown Cave was added to the National Register of Historic Places in 2006. (Note: The National Register of Historic Places site code for Franktown Cave is 5DA272. Information about this site is available at 1) State Historic Preservation Office, 2) Colorado Historical Society and 3) Anthropology Department, University of Denver.)

== See also ==
- National Register of Historic Places listings in Douglas County, Colorado
- Cedar Point Village - archaeological site in southwestern Colorado also having Dismal River cultural artifacts
- Cherry Creek Rockshelter
- List of prehistoric sites in Colorado

== Bibliography ==
- Cassells, E. Steve. (1997) [1983] The Archaeology of Colorado. Boulder: Johnson Press. ISBN 1-55566-193-9.
- Gibbon, Guy E.; Ames, Kenneth M. Archaeology of Prehistoric Native America: An Encyclopedia. 1998. ISBN 0-8153-0725-X.
- Gilmore, Kevin P. National Register Nomination Form: Franktown Cave. Site 5DA272. University of Denver. p. 8-9. Retrieved 9-27-2011.
- Griffin-Pierce, Trudy. (2010). The Columbia Guide to American Indians of the Southwest. New York:Columbia University Press. ISBN 978-0-231-12790-5.
- Gunnerson, James H. (1987). Archaeology of the High Plains. Denver: United States Forest Service.
- King, Anthony (2006). Substance Dynamics and Stone Tools at Franktown Cave, Colorado. Unpublished Thesis. Note: An unpublished Thesis is not generally considered a reliable source.
- Kipfer, Barbara Ann. (2000). Encyclopedic Dictionary of Archaeology. New York:Plenum Publisher. ISBN 0-306-46158-7.
- Nelson, Sarah M. (2008). Denver: An Archaeological History. Boulder, CO: University Press of Colorado. p. 74. ISBN 978-0-87081-935-3.
- Waldman, Carl. (2009) [1985]. Atlas of the North American. New York:Facts on File. ISBN 978-0-8160-6858-6.
