= Tenderfoot site 5GN1835 =

Located in the upper Gunnison basins, Tenderfoot is a prehistoric or Archaic site that was excavated by Mark Stiger, with assistance from facility and students at Western State College. The site is located near Gunnison, Colorado on a low ridge that extends west from Tenderfoot Mountain overlooking the joining of the Gunnison and Tomichi River.

== Research ==
First recorded in 1986 by the Complete Archaeological Service Associates (CASA) of Cortez, Colorado site 5GN1835 was originally described as a small lithic scatter with little scientific significance. During the spring of 1991 Western State Colorado University was requested to survey on the site by the City of Gunnison who wanted to place a tree disposal area on the seventy-four acre parcel of land. Mark Stiger and two undergraduate students surveyed the land and found several areas of concentrated archeological material along with a proper area without archeological material for the tree dump. After the initial survey results a proposal for research was requested by the city of Gunnison. Funding for the site came from several different sources including: Colorado Historical Society (Historic Fund Projects), The City of Gunnison (Challenge Grant Program), the Western State Colorado University Foundation, Western State Colorado University, and private donors.

Fieldwork began in 1991 and lasted through 1998 and was successful in recovering significant archaeological information and presenting it to the public. The site was excavated with a Total Mapping Station (TMS). The weather of the Gunnison basin restricted the fieldwork to June, July, and August. Standard excavation methods were employed using archeological tools on 1x1 meter squares. The soil was then carried to a 1/8-inch screen mesh and sifted. The seven-year excavation was conducted in a 428 square meter block that contains ninety features and yielded 24,621 artifacts. The first surface collection yielded 24,149 flake stone artifacts, the second surface collection yielded 4,420 flaked-stone artifacts, and the third collection yielded 5,215 artifacts. The stone tools found were classified into: bi-faces, uni-faces, hafted bi-faces, cores, hammer stones, choppers, used edges, and ground stone artifacts (manos, metates and abraders).

== Site ==
The site includes over 85 features with lined and unlined rock fire pits and storage pits, post holes, fire cracked rock features, and a structure. Archaic structures have been found that date to the earliest Archaic and maybe to late Paleoindian periods. These earliest structures are round or oval, shallow, basin-shaped features about 13–16 feet (4–5 m) in diameter. Some have postholes. The best-preserved structures have interior hearths, bell-shaped storage features, and other pits in the floors. Residential houses were identified by floor features (fire pit, bell shaped storage pit and post holes) the pattern of outside features (hearth, storage pits and trash dump) the presence of certain artifacts (ground stone, bone needle, and stone knives) and the similarity to several other archaic features. A wide range of structure types is represented in this time period. A cribbed-log structure covered with brush and daub has been excavated and reported. Daub structures are reported, as well as basin-shaped structures. Test excavations in the trash deposit of one village site showed almost two meters' accumulation of charcoal, ash, bone, and stone tool debris. This evidence shows that these structures were occupied throughout the winter season.

The post-Pleistocene soil deposits were shallow reaching the hard calcareous soil within 7.9 inches (20 cm) or less. Surrounding pits were dug to check for deposits and only a few sites with additional cultural material were found in 1994. Radiocarbon samples were taken from 4 features on the edge of the site. Over 24,621 lithic artifacts mainly consisting of quartzites, cherts, and obsidian were recovered during excavation with analysis that designed to answer several questions about prehistoric technology. This type of analysis attempts to treat each artifact is recorded as a group of measurements. Variables that were measured to inform lithic technology included raw material, platform type, cortex on dorsal surface, condition, form and termination.

All contents of features at Tenderfoot underwent flotation analysis using a standard water/aerator process. This process was interrupted by an unknown mineral within Gunnison soil that prevented some of the organic material from floating to the surface for analysis. After conducting several experiments the lead archaeologists on site found that floating a soil sample twice (double flotation) with complete drying between flotations solved the problem. Double flotation coupled with heavy fraction processing became the standard procedure at the site and increased the recovery of organic material.

During the digs in 1991 several hundred visitors along with the Gunnison county public schools toured the site. From 1991-1999 Western State College has given tours, and gave presentations to K-12 students, civic groups and public forums. Placed on the State register of Historic Properties List of prehistoric sites in ColoradoTenderfoot has proved to be a significant archaeological site. Further information can be found at and at
