= List of prehistoric sites in Colorado =

Coordinates: 38.9972°N 105.5478°W

The location of the State of Colorado in the United States of America.

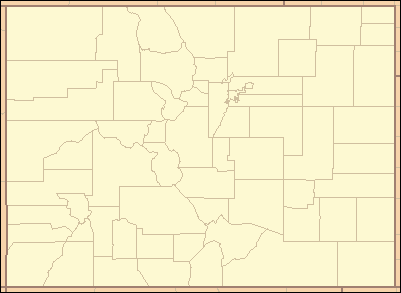
The 64 counties of the U.S. State of Colorado.

This list of prehistoric sites in the U.S. State of Colorado includes historical and archaeological sites of humans from their earliest times in Colorado to just before the Colorado historic period, which ranges from about 12,000 BC to AD 19th century. The Period is defined by the culture enjoyed at the time, from the earliest hunter-gatherers, the Paleo-Indians, through to the prehistoric parents to the modern Native Americans.

There were more than 56,500 recorded prehistoric sites in Colorado by 1996. Important historic and archaeological sites are registered nationally with the National Register of Historic Places (National register) and within the state's Colorado State Register of Historic Properties (State register). Most of the sites below are registered in one more both registers and was the source for most of the information for this section:

== Prehistoric sites in Colorado ==
#	Site	County	Period	Date range	Site type	Cultures	Historic register	Comments
35	Albert Porter Pueblo (Site ID 5MT.123)	Montezuma, near Yellow Jacket	Ancient Pueblo	AD late 12th century - early 13th century	Residential		National, State	McElmo Drainage Unit.
27	Anasazi Heritage Center (Site ID 5MT.6599)	Montezuma, near Dolores	Ancient Pueblo	AD 1120–1200	Residential		National, State	
16	Ansel Hall Ruin (5DL.27)	Dolores, near Cahone	Ancient Pueblo		Residential	Northern San Juan	National, State	
91	Apishapa River area sites	Otero, near Fowler	Plains village	AD 1000–1350	Residential	Apishapa phase		Sites include: Cramer, Canterbury, Snake Blakeslee, Juan Baca, Munsell.
56	Barger Gulch Locality B	Grand, near Kremmling	Early Paleo-Indian	14,999 - 9000 BC	Camp		National	Not listed on the State Register site.
36	Bass site (Site ID 5MT.136)	Montezuma, near Yellow Jacket	Ancient Pueblo	AD late 12th century - early 13th century	Residential		National, State	McElmo Drainage Unit
78	Bayou Gulch	Douglas, near Parker	Early Archaic-Protohistoric	BC - AD	Campsite	McKean complex		
84	Bellwood site	Pueblo, near Colorado City	Plains Woodland	AD 395–505	Residential	Bellwood type site, Graneros phase, Arkansas River basin.		
30	Bement site (Site ID 5MT.4388)	Montezuma, near Mancos	Ancient Pueblo	AD 750 - 850; AD 1000–1150	Residential		State	
7	Bloomfield Site (Site ID SME395)	Mesa, near Whitewater	Archaic	8999 BC - AD 1799	Extractive		National, State	
73	Bradford House II (Site ID 5JF51)	Jefferson, near Littleton	Archaic, Prehistoric	499 BC - 1749 AD	Residential		National, State	The state register reports occupancy from 3000 BC - AD 1540.
74	Bradford House III (Site ID 5JF52)	Jefferson, near Morrison	Archaic, Plains Woodland	4999 BC - AD 1000	Village		National, State	From the State register, at least five occupations (2 Archaic periods, 3 Plains Woodland).
17	Brewer Archaeological District (Site ID 5DL.578)	Dolores, near Dove Creek	Ancient Pueblo	AD 1000–1300	Residential		State	
83	Calhan Paint Mines Archeological District (Site ID 5EP.3258)	El Paso, near Calhan	Archaic to prehistoric	499 BC - AD 1900	Campsite	Cody complex, Duncan Complex, Apishapa culture	National, State	The State register shows historical significance starting about 8100 BC.
3	Cañon Pintado (Site ID 5RB.984)	Rio Blanco, near Rangely	Plains, prehistoric	500 - 1899 AD	Campsite, Rock art	Fremont, Ute	National, State	Visited by Dominguez-Escalante Expedition in 1776.
28	Canyons of the Ancients National Monument	Montezuma and Dolores counties	Paleo-Indian, Basket Makers, Ancient Pueblo	6000 BC - AD mid- 12th century	Campsite, residential		National, State	Lowry Pueblo, Sand Canyon Pueblo and Roy's Ruin
48	Carnero Creek Pictographs Historical Site (La Garita) (Site ID 5SH.48)	Saguache, near La Garita	Prehistoric	AD 1000–1749	Rock Art		National, State	Also a National Significant Archaeological Site.
4	Carrot Men Pictograph Site (Site ID AR-05-101-98)	Rio Blanco, near Rangely	Prehistoric	500 - 1499 AD	Campsite		National, State	
1	Castle Park Archeological District (Site ID 5MF.5803)	Moffat, near Dinosaur	Prehistoric	1500 - 1000 BC; AD 1000–1899	Residential	Fremont, Ute, Shoshone	National, State	
81	Cedar Point Village	Elbert, near Limon			Residential	Dismal River culture		
49	Chance Gulch Site (Site ID 5GN.817)	Gunnison, near Gunnison	Paleo-Indian, Archaic, Prehistoric	10,999 - 9000 BC; 5500 - 6499 BC; AD 0 - 499	Campsite		National, State	
47	Chimney Rock National Monument (Site ID 5AA.985)	Archuleta	Ancient Pueblo	AD 0 - 1500	Residential		National, State	
93	Claypool (Site ID 5WL18)	Washington, near Otis	Paleo-Indian	8000 - 5000 BC	Campsite or kill site	Clovis points, Cody complex		The location is about 4 mi. e. and 19 mi. s. of Otis.
5	Collage Shelter Site (Site ID 5 RB820)	Rio Blanco, near Rangely	Prehistoric	500 AD - 1499 AD	Campsite	Fremont	National	
86	Colorado Millennial Site (Site ID 5LA1115)	Las Animas, near Ruxton; Baca	Paleo-Indian, Archaic, Woodland, Prehistoric	7000 BC - AD 1900	Camp, village, rock art		National, State	Sites: Hackberry Springs and Bloody Springs.
11	Cottonwood Cave (Site ID 5MN.519)	Montrose, near Nucla		270 BC	Residential		State	Large rock shelter, with the earliest finding of corn in Colorado.
18	Cowboy Wash	Montezuma, near Cortez	Ancient Pueblo	AD 1150–1175	Residential			
19	Crow Canyon Archaeological Center	Montezuma, near Cortez	Ancient Pueblo	Before AD 1300	Residential			
50	Curecanti Archeological District (Site ID 5GN.1728)	Gunnison, near Gunnison	Archaic	10,999 BC - AD 1749	Village		National, State	Many 5GN--- Site IDs.
43	Darkmold Site (Site ID 5LP.4991)	La Plata, near Durango	Archaic, Basket maker	220 BC - AD 750	Campsite, residential		State	
66	Dent site	Weld, near Milliken	Paleo-Indian	9200 BC	Kill site	Clovis		
94	Dipper Gap (Site ID 5LO101)	Logan, near Stoneham (about 30 m. nne.)	Middle to late Archaic	BC	Campsite and residential	McKean complex		
14	Dolores Cave	Montrose, near Uravan	Pre-Pueblo, Ancient Pueblo, prehistoric	600 BC to AD 1400	Residential		State	
44	Durango Rock Shelters Archeology Site (Site ID 5LP4134)	La Plata, near Durango	Basket maker	AD 0 - 1000	Campsite		National, State	
9	Ferganchick Orchard Rock Art Site (5DT.355)	Delta, near Austin	Western Archaic, prehistoric	AD 0 - 1799	Work of Art	Uncompahgre Complex, Ute	National, State	
58	Fourth of July Valley (Site ID 5BL120)	Grand, near Tabernash	Paleo-Indian, Archaic	7000 - 4000 BC	Campsite, kill site, possibly residential	James Allen, McKean cultures		
67	Fowlers Parrish (Site ID 5WL100)	Weld, near Orchard	Paleo-Indian		Bison kill and maybe butchery site	Folsom culture		
76	Franktown Cave (Site ID 5DA.272)	Douglas, near Franktown	Archaic, Ceramic, and Protohistoric	6400 BC - AD 1725	Campsite, Residential		National, State	
6	Fremont Lookout Fortification Site (Site ID AR-05-101-99)	Rio Blanco, near Rangely	Prehistoric	0 - 1499 AD	Campsite, fortification.	Fremont	National, State	
61	Hatch site (Site ID 5WL38)	Weld				Agate Bluff site		
20	Hawkins Preserve	Montezuma, near Cortez	Ancient Pueblo	AD 1000–1150	Residential, Rock art			
79	Helmer Ranch	Douglas, near Waterton	Early Archaic		Campsite	Mount Albion complex		
21	Hovenweep National Monument (Site ID 5MT.604)	Montezuma, near Cortez	Ancient Pueblo	8000 BC - AD 1350	Residential, Rock art, Solar calendar		National, State	
70a	Hungry Whistler Site (Site ID 5BL67)	Boulder, near Ward	Archaic		Kill and butchery site	Mount Albion		On the slopes of Mount Albion.
85	Indian Petroglyphs and Pictographs (Site ID 5PE.14)	Pueblo, near Penrose	Prehistoric	AD 1000–1499	Rock Art	Ute	National, State	In Turkey Creek Canyon.
32	James A. Lancaster Site (Site ID 5MT.4803)	Montezuma, near Pleasant View	Ancient Pueblo		Residential		National, State	Also called Clawson Ruin. McElmo Drainage Unit.
37	Joe Ben Wheat Site Complex (Site ID 5MT.16722)	Montezuma, near Yellow Jacket	Ancient Pueblo	AD 1075–1300	Residential		National, State	McElmo Drainage Unit.
95	Jones-Miller Bison Kill Site	Yuma	Paleo-Indian	8000 - 8050 BC	Bison kill and butchery	Hell Gap complex		
65	Jurgens Site (Site ID 5WL 53)	Weld, near Kersey	Paleo-Indian	7150 BC	Bison butchery, campsite, residential	Cody complex	National, State	
60	Kaplan-Hoover Site (Site ID 5LR3953)	Larimer, near Windsor	Archaic	999 - 500 BC	Kill and butchery site		National, State	One of the largest communal kill sites, used seasonally.
63	Keota Stone Circles Archaeological District (Site ID 5WL.662)	Weld, near Keota	Paleo-Indian through prehistoric	6999 BC - AD 1799	Campsite, village		National, State	Also known as D. J. Shull Tipi Ring Sites.
72	Ken-Caryl South Valley Archaeological District (Site ID 5JF.2758)	Jefferson, near Indian Hills		3000 BC - 1000 AD	Campsites, residential, multi-sites			
77	Lamb Spring (Site ID 5DA.83)	Douglas, near Littleton	Paleo-Indian	11,000 - 6500 BC	Campsite	Cody complex, others	National, State	
8	Land's End Aboriginal Site (Site ID 5ME.1057)	Mesa, near Whitewater	Archaic				State	
59	Lindenmeier site (Site ID 5LR.13)	Larimer, near Fort Collins	Paleo-Indian, Archaic, prehistoric	8600 - 8720 BC	Campsite, residential	Folsom	National, State	
75	LoDaisKa site (Site ID 5JF.142)	Jefferson, near Morrison	Archaic, Ceramic (woodland periods)	3000 BC - AD 1000	Campsite, residential		National, State	
31	Lost Canyon Archeological District (Site ID 5MT.10435)	Montezuma, near Mancos	Ancient Pueblo	AD 1050–1300	Residential		National, State	
71	Magic Mountain site (Site ID 5JF223)	Jefferson, near Golden	Archaic, woodland	4999 BC - AD 1000	Campsite, residential		National, State	
2	Mantle's Cave (Site ID 5MF1)	Moffat, near Dinosaur	Prehistoric	499 BC - AD 1749	Residential, Rock art \ Petroglyph	Fremont	National, State	
22	McElmo Drainage Unit (many Site IDs)	Montezuma, near Cortez	Ancient Pueblo	AD 1075–1300	Pueblo		National, State	Cannonball Ruins, Roy's Ruin, Sand Canyon, Wallace Ruins and other sites.
23	Mesa Verde National Park (Site ID 5MT.9790)	Montezuma, near Cortez	Ancient Pueblo	AD 550–1300	Residential, Rock art		National, State	
24	Mitchell Springs Archeological Site (Site ID 5MT.10991)	Montezuma, near Cortez	Ancient Pueblo	AD 500–1000	Residential		National, State	
70	Mount Albion	Boulder or Grand County				Mount Albion complex		
25	Mud Springs Pueblo (Site ID 5MT.4466)	Montezuma, near Cortez	Ancient Pueblo	AD 1000–1499	Residential		National, State	Also called Toltec Springs.
29	O'Brien Site (Site ID 5MT.5518)	Montezuma, near Dolores	Ancient Pueblo	AD 1075–1150	Residential		State	
	Olsen-Chubbuck Bison Kill Site	Cheyenne, near Firstview	Paleo-Indian, Plains	8000-6500 B.C.	Kill site	Cody complex		
57	Phillips-Williams Fork Reservoir Site	Grand, near Parshall	Paleo-Indian		Campsite			
	Picture Canyon	Baca	Paleo-Indian, Plains Archaic, Plains Woodland, Apishapa culture		Campsite, residential, rock art, solar calendar			
89	Piñon Canyon Maneuver Site	Las Animas, near Trinidad			Rock art			Over 50 structure sites, including La Placita.
33	Pigge Site (Site ID 5MT.4802)	Montezuma, near Pleasant View	Ancient Pueblo		Residential		National, State	McElmo Drainage Unit.
54	Porcupine Peak Site (Site ID 5ST98)	Summit, near Dillon	Paleo-Indian, prehistoric	6999 BC - 1499 AD	Village		National, State	
64	Powars (Site ID 5WL1369)	Weld, near Kersey	Paleo-Indian		Campsite	Folsom		Near the Kersey site, i.e., Jurgens Site.
34	Puzzle House (Site ID 5MT.11787)	Montezuma, near Pleasant View	Pre-Pueblo, Ancient Pueblo	AD 650 and twice between AD 1075–1225.	Residential		State	
69	Rock Creek Site (Site ID 5BL2712)	Boulder, near Boulder	Archaic, Ceramic	5500-3300 BC, AD 1-1550	Multi-component		State	
80	Roxborough State Park Archaeological District (Site ID 5DA.343)	Douglas, near Waterton	Paleo-Indian, Archaic, woodland	4999 BC - AD 1000	Campsite, residential		National, State	
38	Seven Towers Pueblo (Site ID 5MT.1000)	Montezuma, near Yellow Jacket	Ancient Pueblo	AD 1150–1300	Residential		National, State	McElmo Drainage Unit.
10	Savano Valley Rock Art Site (Site ID 5MN.5)	Montose, near Montrose	Archaic, Protohistoric	1000 BC - AD 1881	Work of Art		State	
82	Smiley Rock shelter	Elbert, near Limon			Residential	Upper Republican		
42	Spring Creek Archeological District (Site ID 5LP.1254)	La Plata, near Bayfield	Basket maker, Ancient Pueblo, prehistoric	499 BC - AD 1824	Village	Athabascan, Ute.	National, State	
12	Tabeguache Cave (Site ID 5MN.868)	Montrose, near Nucla			Residential		State	
15	Tabeguache Cave II (Site ID 5MN.890)	Montrose, near Uravan	Pre-Pueblo, Ancient Pueblo, prehistoric	AD 600–1500	Residential		State	
13	Tabeguache Pueblo (Site ID 5MN.1609)	Montrose, near Nucla	Ancient Pueblo	AD 1100	Residential		State	
45	Talus Village (Site ID 5LP.4223)	La Plata, near Durango	Basket maker		Residential		State	
51	Tenderfoot Archaeological Site (Site ID 5GN.1835)	Gunnison, near Gunnison	Prehistoric				State	
90	Torres Cave Archeological Site (Site ID 5AL1310)	Las Animas, near Villegreen	Woodland	AD 1 - 1500	Campsite	Apishapa, Granersos, Panhandle	National, State	
88	Trinchera Cave Archeological District (Site ID 5LA9555)	Las Animas, near Trinchera	Archaic, Apishapa culture	499 BC - AD 1749	Campsite, residential		National, State	
52	Unnamed site (Site ID 5EA484)	Eagle, near Basalt	Archaic, Prehistoric	AD 1000–1499	Campsite	Ute	National, State	
41	Unnamed site 5MT4700	Montezuma, near Yellow Jacket	Ancient Pueblo		Residential		National, State	McElmo Drainage Unit.
87	Unnamed Sopris phase sites 5LA121, 5LA1416	Las Animas, near Segundo	Plains village	AD 1000 - 1225+	Residential	Sopris		
46	Ute Mountain Ute Mancos Canyon Historic District (Site ID 5MT.4342)	La Plata, near Red Mesa and Montezuma	Ancient Pueblo	AD 500–1499	Residential		National, State	
92	Vogel Canyon (Site ID 5OT.551)	Otero, near La Junta	Prehistoric				State	
68	West Stoneham Archeological District (Site ID 5WL.2180)	Weld, near Stoneham	Paleo-Indian, Archaic, prehistoric	6999 BC - AD 1749	Camp, Residential		National, State	
62	Wilbur Thomas Shelter (Site ID 5WL45)	Weld, near Carr	Archaic, Woodland (ceramic)			McKean complex		
55	Windy Gap Archaeological site (Site ID 5GA151)	Grand, near Granby	Early Archaic					
39	Woods Canyon Pueblo (Site ID 5MT.11842)	Montezuma, near Yellow Jacket	Ancient Pueblo	AD 13th century	Residential		National, State	
53	Yarmony House (Site ID 5EA799)	Eagle, near Radium	Paleo-Indian, Archaic, Ceramic	6499 - 1000 BC	Residential	Mount Albion complex, Archaic, Pinto, late prehistoric	National, State	At least 5 periods of occupation.
40	Yellowjacket Pueblo (Site ID 5MT.5)	Montezuma, near Yellow Jacket	Ancient Pueblo		Residential		National, State	McElmo Drainage Unit.
26	Yucca House National Monument (Site ID 5MT.5006)	Montezuma, near Cortez	Ancient Pueblo	AD 1100–1300	Residential		National, State	

== See also ==
- Bibliography of Colorado
- Geography of Colorado
- History of Colorado
- Index of Colorado-related articles
- List of Colorado-related lists
- Outline of Colorado
