= Sopris phase =

Late Ceramic period hunter-gatherer culture

Sopris phase (Upper Purgatoire complex)
- Geographical range: Colorado
- Period: Late Ceramic period (Post-Archaic)
- Dates: AD 1000-1250
- Major sites: Trinchera Cave Archeological District
- Preceded by: Archaic

The Sopris phase (AD 1000-1250) is a Late Ceramic period hunter-gatherer culture of the Upper Purgatoire, also known as the Upper Purgatoire complex. It was first discovered in the southern Colorado, near the present town of Trinidad, Colorado. The Sopris phase appeared to be greatly influenced by Puebloan people, such as the Taos Pueblo and Pecos Pueblo, and through trade in the Upper Rio Grande area.

== Sopris sites ==
Two Sopris Plains sites found at the Trinidad reservoir, Leone Bluff (site 5LA1211) and site ID 5LA1416, are located in Las Animas County, Colorado, near Segundo. The Trinidad sites were found in 1962 when Herbert Dick of the Trinidad State Junior College led an archaeological investigation of the Trinidad Reservoir. By 1980, more archaeological studies had been completed of a total of 300 sites. Site 5LA1416 contained evidence of occupation through all three Sopris phases. The architecture may have been influenced by the Plains villagers, Panhandle and Rio Grande cultures. The pottery, though, was decidedly like that of the Puebloans of the Rio Grande area.

The Leone Bluff (site 5LA1211) and site ID 5LA1416 sites had evidence of four dwellings identified as Sopris phase occupations from about A.D. 1150 to 1300. The pottery remnants were used to identify the Sopris phase and three subsequent periods of inhabitation: post-Sopris phase (about A.D. 1300–1450), historic Spanish-American (about A.D. 1670–1890) and historic Apache (about A.D. 1750–1900). Skeletons were found of people of Apachean, or Athabaskan, heritage.

Trinchera Cave Archeological District is also a Sopris phase site.

== Phases ==
The architecture, pottery and material goods varied greatly during the Sopris phases.

=== Initial ===
The initial Sopris phase occurred between 1000 and 1100 A.D. People dwelled in pit-houses, jacal structures and campsites. Pottery found at initial Sopris sites included Taos gray and distinctly different Sopris plain pottery. Corner-notched points are the most popular projectile points used. Basin metates were used during this time.

=== Early ===
The next period occurred between 1100-1150 A.D. Dwellings were made of adobe or a combination of adobe and jacal construction. Pottery found in early Sopris sites include: Taos gray, Sopris plain pottery, and the appearance of black on white, cordmarked, polished and incised pottery. Material goods included metates, turquoise, beads of stone and shell. Maize was farmed a little during this period.

=== Late ===
The last period occurred between 1150-1250 A.D. Houses were made of sandstone slab masonry, with rounded corners and posts for support. There was a predominance of Taos black on white and Taos gray incised pottery during this time. Grooved mauls and slab metates appeared during this period.
