= Southern Plains villagers =

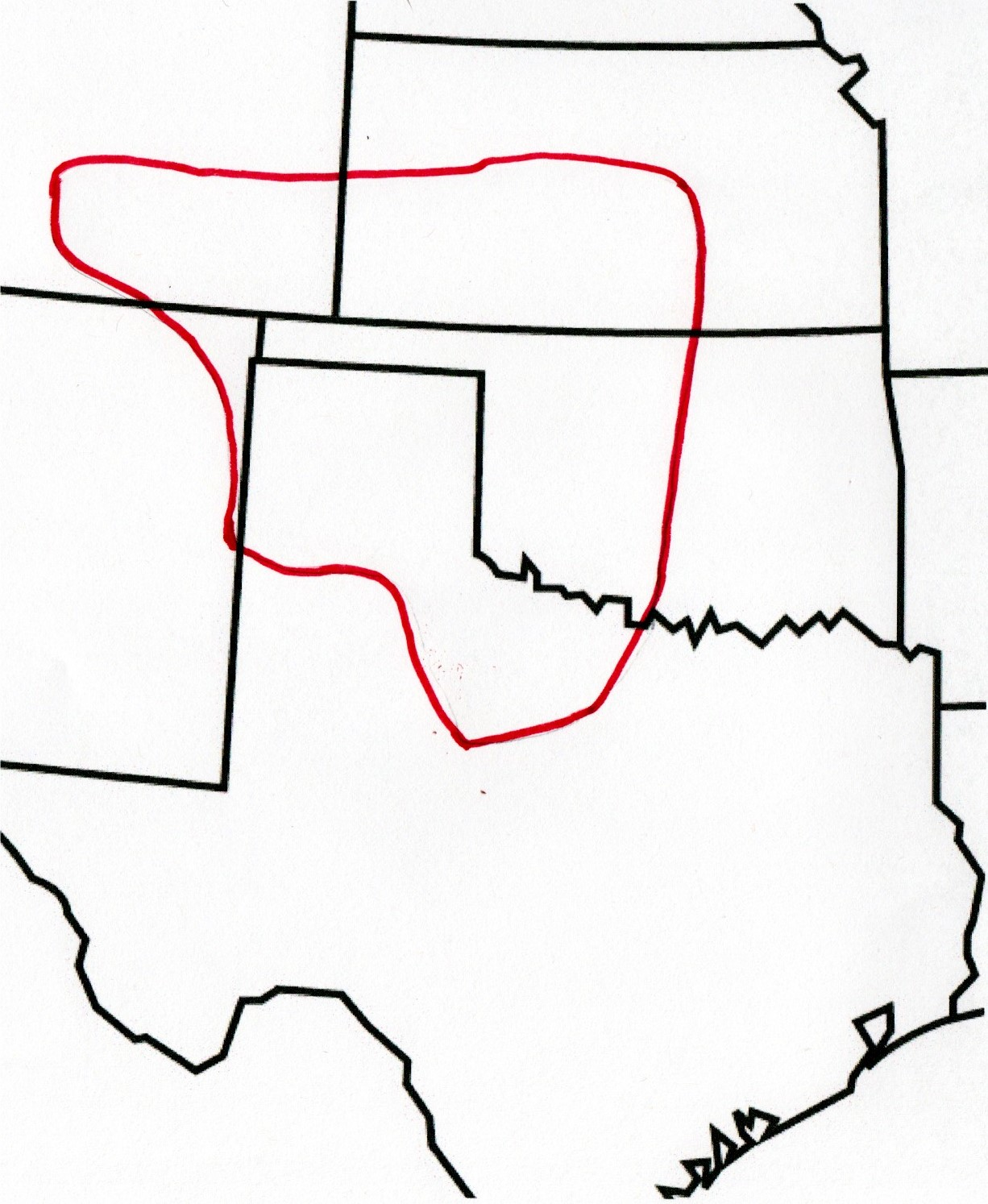
The approximate area occupied by the Southern Plains villagers

The Southern Plains villagers were semi-sedentary Native Americans (American Indians) who lived on the Great Plains in western Oklahoma, Texas, Kansas, and southeastern Colorado from about AD 800 until AD 1500.

Also known as Plains Villagers, the people of this pre-Columbian culture cultivated maize and other crops, hunted bison and other game, and gathered wild plants for food. The people generally lived in hamlets of a few dwellings adjacent to flood plains of rivers such as the Washita and South Canadian Rivers in Oklahoma and Texas. Thousands of hamlets have been identified.

The Southern Plains villagers were likely the ancestors, at least in part, of the historic Wichita and other Caddoan peoples. Some of the Southern Plains Villagers survived into the historic era in the 16th century when Spanish explorers first ventured onto the Great Plains. The Wichita's first contact with Europeans was in 1541 when they were visited by Francisco Coronado in Kansas.

The semi-agrarian economy of the Southern Plains villagers was always vulnerable due to frequent droughts and climatic variations, although the livelihood of the villagers was enhanced by the periodic abundance of bison.

The Southern Plains villagers, especially on their western fringe, were influenced by the agricultural Ancestral Pueblo peoples of the Rio Grande River Valley of New Mexico. They traded bison meat, robes, and stones for tools to the Ancestral Pueblos on their west and to the Caddoans on their east for maize, pottery, and Osage orange wood for making bows.

Archaeologists have divided the Southern Plains villagers into many different archaeological variants based on differences in what has been found of their material possessions. The Redbed Plains variant includes the Paoli, Washita River, Custer, and Turkey Creek phases of western Oklahoma; the Henrietta and Wylie Creek focuses are located in north-central Texas; the Upper Canark variant in the Texas and Oklahoma panhandles includes the Antelope Creek Phase, and the Buried City and Zimms complexes; the Apishapa phase in southeastern Colorado; and the Bluff Creek, Wilmore, and Pratt complexes are in south central Kansas. The proto-historic Wichita villages in central Kansas are called the Great Bend aspect.

== Origins ==
In the opinion of archaeologists, the Southern Plains villagers were likely, in whole or part, speakers of Caddoan languages, the ancestors of the historical Wichita, Kichai, and possibly the Pawnee. Some of the easternmost sites of the Southern Plains villagers show an almost unbroken record of occupation for thousands of years and thus it appears, again in whole or part, that the villager's culture developed from people who had long lived in the area rather than being introduced by migrants. The apparent Caddoan origin of the villagers, however, does not preclude the possibility of non-Caddoan speakers and linguistic and ethnic diversity in the region.

Three technological developments in the early centuries of the Common Era led to the replacement of nomadic hunter-gatherer cultures by semi-sedentary cultures on the Southern Great Plains: the replacement of spears and the atlatl by the bow and arrow, a more efficient tool for hunting; the introduction of pottery for storage and cookery; and the adoption of maize agriculture as a major source of food. None of these new technologies was likely invented in the Southern Plains region but rather the knowledge seeped into the area from outside. With these new technologies, the population probably expanded and it became possible or necessary for the former hunter-gatherers of the Southern Plains to become semi-sedentary agriculturalists.

== Characteristics ==
Some of the earliest remains of the Southern Plains Villagers may be in what is called the Paoli phase, located around the Oklahoma town of Paoli and the Washita River Valley and the nearby South Canadian River Valley. Radiocarbon dates for Paoli sites are from AD 900 until about 1250 when the Paoli phase evolved into the Washita River phase, dating from 1250 to 1450. Paoli village sites developed in place from earlier hunter-gatherer settlements. The Paoli and Washita River people lived in hamlets of up to ten thatched-roof houses typically built on terraces overlooking rivers. Hamlets often stood only a few hundred meters from each other indicating a fairly dense population. The Washita phase is distinguished from Paoli by differences in arrowheads, pottery, and architecture.

These people cultivated maize and indigenous marsh elder, hunted and caught deer, rabbits, fish, and mussels, and gathered edible wild plants such as Chenopodium (goosefoot or lambs-quarters), amaranth, sunflower, little barley, maygrass, dropseed, and erect knotweed. They added beans and squash to their crops around 1200. As cultivation of maize, beans, and squash, the "Three Sisters" of Native American agriculture, expanded, use of earlier indigenous crops declined. Bison remains are scarce in earlier sites, but bison became more important as a source of food around 1300, indicating that their herds may have become more abundant in the region of the Paoli and Washita settlements.

The Custer (800–1250) and Turkey Creek phases (1250–1450) were located further west than the Paoli and Washita phases but on the same Washita and South Canadian Rivers. Custer and Turkey Creek people knapped projectile points stones from the Alibates quarries of the Texas Panhandle. There is no evidence that they grew squash and beans in addition to maize. They possibly had a greater reliance on gathering wild foods rather than cultivating crops. This finding is consistent with the drier climate of western Oklahoma compared to the more easterly Paoli and Washita phases. During the later Turkey Creek phase reliance on bison as a major food source increased.

The Henrietta focus or Henrietta complex extends from the Red River valley of Oklahoma and Texas southward to the Clear Fork of the Brazos River near Graham, Texas. The Henrietta focus dates from approximately AD 1100 to 1500. The best-known site of the focus is Harrell, near Graham, which is also the southernmost major site at which Southern Plains villagers lived. South of Harrell the pre-Columbian Indians in Texas were hunter-gatherers, who apparently did not practice agriculture. The Harrell site features a large cemetery demonstrating that the site was inhabited for thousands of year. The Wylie focus is located north of Dallas and reflects a blend of the Woodland agricultural society of the Caddo in East Texas and the Great Plains societies to its west. It dates from AD 1000 or earlier.

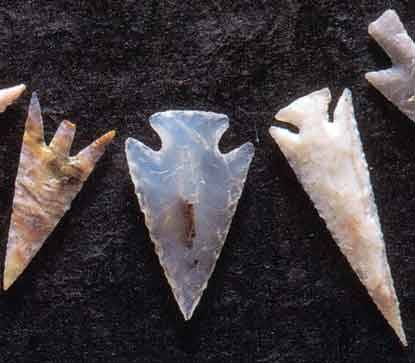
Arrowheads made from Alibates flint found in the Texas panhandle were widely traded by the Southern Plains Villagers.

The Upper Canark variant includes the Antelope Creek Phase, Panhandle phase, Optima focus, and the Buried City and Zimms complexes. All these manifestations of Canark were located in the Texas and Oklahoma Panhandles, the Zimms complex extending into western Oklahoma. The Canark variant dates from about 1100 to 1500. It is distinguished by the stone-slab foundations of its dwellings, which in multifamily and single-family structures. The people of the Canark variant may have borrowed the technology of their construction from the Pueblo peoples in the Rio Grande Valley in New Mexico and were possibly related linguistically to the Pueblo speakers. The majority opinion; however, is that they spoke a Caddoan language and were related to the Southern Plains villagers living to their east.

The people of the Canark variant grew maize, beans, squash, and probably sunflowers in addition to hunting (mainly bison) and gathering wild food plants. The drought-prone area they occupied is marginal for agriculture without irrigation and the bulk of its 16 to 24 inches annual rainfall arrived in a few thunderstorms that cause flooding. Thus, the Antelope Creek people probably used water harvesting or "Ak-Chin" dryland farming techniques similar to those practiced by the Ancestral Pueblo peoples.

The Apishapa Phase in southeastern Colorado dates from 900 to 1400 and is characterized by stone slab architecture, often in defensible positions on mesas. The Apishaspa culture probably evolved in place from the earlier Graneros phase. They appear to have been primarily hunter-gatherers, but archaeologists have found some evidence of maize cultivation. Agriculture, however, was probably relatively unimportant due to the semiarid climate and the rocky canyons and dry mesas where many Apishapa dwellings have been found. It is uncertain whether the abundant petroglyphs of the area were the work of the Apishapa people.

The Bluff Creek, Pratt, and Wilmore complexes are located in south-central Kansas near and along the tributaries of the Arkansas River. Bluff Creek is the earliest, dating from about 1000 until 1500. Pratt and Wilmore perhaps derive from Bluff Creek, dating from about 1400 until 1500. The Kansas sites are similar to the sites of the Southern Plains Villagers further south in Oklahoma. Along the Arkansas River in northernmost Oklahoma is the Uncas site, which is quite different than the others in the character of its dwellings and pottery and possibly represents an intrusion of unrelated people.

== Protohistoric period ==
Around 1400, during the Wheeler phase, some Southern Plains Villages moved from small, scattered villages to larger agrarian settlements, in particular the Little River focus and Lower Walnut focus peoples in south-central Kansas and north-central Oklahoma. The Edwards Archaeological Site is located in southwestern Oklahoma. These village-dwelling, urban, Southern Plains farmers are sometimes called Coalesced Villagers. Meanwhile, others shifted their subsistence patterns, to rely less on agriculture and more upon bison-hunting,

Several theories have been advanced to explain why many Southern Plains Villagers opted to relay more heavily on bison-hunting. First, Southern Athabascans, the Apaches, moved into the Southern Plains and displaced the villagers. Second, bison populations on the Southern Great Plains fluctuated. They may have increased in numbers around AD 1400, and villagers may have begun to rely less on agriculture and more on hunting which required them to be more mobile and less sedentary. Third, a long-lasting drought or climatic change to drier conditions may have reduced the feasibility of an agricultural economy on the southern plains. These theories are not mutually exclusive.

When Coronado traversed the Great Plains of Texas and Oklahoma in 1541, he found only bison-hunting nomads rather than farming villages. The Querechos he found near present day Amarillo, Texas were almost certainly Apaches. The Teyas he found east of present day Lubbock, Texas might also have been Apaches, or perhaps the Caddoan descendants of the Southern Plains villagers. Coronado also found maize-growing Wichita Indians in the land he called Quivira in present-day Rice County, Kansas.

In 1601 Juan de Oñate found the agricultural Rayados, his term for the Wichitas, living in the city of Etzanoa in present-day Arkansas City, Kansas. Both the Quivirans and Rayados were living more than 200 miles east and in much more favorable climates for agriculture than where maize and other crops had been grown by the Southern Plains villagers hundreds of years earlier. The protohistorical Wichita settlements in Kansas are called the Great Bend aspect by archaeologists.

== See also ==
- Plains Village period, ca. 900–1800 CE
