= Apishapa culture =

Prehistoric culture

Apishapa
- Culture
- Location: Lower Apishapa canyon in Colorado

The Apishapa culture, or Apishapa Phase, a prehistoric culture from 1000 to 1400, was named based upon an archaeological site in the Lower Apishapa canyon in Colorado. The Apishapa River, a tributary of the Arkansas River, formed the Apishapa canyon. In 1976, there were 68 Apishapa sites on the Chaquaqua Plateau in southeastern Colorado.

== Origin ==
The Apishapa culture, primarily found in the Arkansas River basin of southeastern Colorado, may have evolved from the Panhandle culture or people indigenous to Colorado of the Woodland Period culture.

== Culture ==
Apishapa sites, found in Colorado and New Mexico, represented a tradition of hunter gatherers who sometimes farmed beans and five types of maize. They gathered wild plants and hunted bison, deer, pronghorn, rabbit and other small game with bow and arrow, atlatl, spears and darts. At Picture Canyon, known for its rock art, the Apishapa lived on the canyon rim and farmed on the canyon floor. Horizontal lines of writing were found there, similar to 50 sites in Oklahoma and southeastern Colorado, which have been translated to include solar, planting and travel related information.

Identified by archaeologist Robert G. Campbell in 1975, the Apishapa culture of southeastern Colorado's Chaquaqua Plateau was thought to be an outgrowth of the Graneros from the Texas panhandle. Other noted archaeologists, however, dispute the connection between the Apishapa and the Panhandle culture, a prehistoric culture of the southern High Plains during the Middle Ceramic Period from A.D. 1200–1400. The Apishapa culture, while similar, is no longer considered a part of the Panhandle culture. It is also similar, except for architecture, to the culture of the Upper Republican River basin.

== Dwellings ==
The people of the Apishapa phase lived in rock shelters, single or multi-room stone or slab structures or in campsites, generally in protected areas near flowing water and canyon bottomland, and located on protected points or isolated mesas.

=== Stone slab buildings ===
Generally, stone slab dwellings were one-room round or oval buildings, however there were also groupings of roomblocks up to 37 rooms.

James Gunnerson, an archaeologist from the University of Nebraska–Lincoln, conducted studies on two notable Apishapa sites, Snake Blakeslee and Cramer in 1985 and 1986 dated between A.D. 1250–1350. The Cramer site (Site ID 5PE484) at the mouth of Apishapa canyon showed evidence of structures made of stone slabs, the walls about 3.3 feet (1.0 m) thick, built into a depression of 12 to 20 inches (30 to 51 cm) deep. The largest dwelling was 23 to 25 feet (7.0 to 7.6 m) in diameter. It is hypothesized that four posts in the center of the rooms supported a roof and the outer wall was filled in with brush and grass and covered with wet clay. The Snake Blakeslee site (Site ID 5LA1247), located about 5 miles from the Cramer site in Apishapa canyon, consists of at least 11 rooms in 2 room blocks. Other Apishapa sites include the Sorenson site along the Purgatoire River with stone slab buildings of 3-25 rooms and the Avery Ranch site (Site ID 5PE56) located in Turkey Canyon on Fort Carson army installation in Colorado. The Avery Ranch site was inhabited during two periods, between about A.D. 1020-1040 and again A.D. 1200–1290.

=== Campsites ===
Apishapa campsites have been found in Carrizo Ranches, north of Pueblo on the Wallace site and on the north end of Fort Carson in Colorado. In New Mexico, a campsite was found on the Steamboat Island Fort.

=== Rock shelters ===
People of the Apishapa culture also made their homes in rock shelters, such as the Pyeatt, Trinchera Cave, Medina, and Upper Plum Canyon. Franktown Cave also has remains of pottery like that of the Apishapa.

== Material goods ==
They made cord-wrapped pottery and used smaller side-notched, triangular projectile points than other Plains tribes. Unlike other Plains people, they did not use tools made of bison bones. Artifacts from this phase include a wide range of tools, cord-wrapped pottery and baskets.

In addition to projectile points, other stone tools found at Apishapa sites include knives, scrapers, gravers, choppers, axes and drills. Manos and metates were used for food preparation. Bones artifacts, such as awls, yucca and rabbit fur cordage and woven matting were also found.

== Interaction with other indigenous people ==
The Apishapa appeared to build their villages, sometimes called "forts," in highly-defendable positions. One set of sites occurs along a 6.835 miles (11.000 km) area along a canyon, seemingly so that signals could be relayed from one location to another. They may have needed to defend their stores of food due to population explosion and changing climatic conditions.

Based upon the presence of distinctive black on white pottery, they may also have traded with the Ancient Pueblo People, or Anasazi. Other evidence of trade includes Medicine Creek jasper from Nebraska, Alibates silicified dolomite from the Texas Panhandle, Olivella seashells from the Pacific Ocean, obsidian and other forms of pottery.

== Outcome ==
The number of Apishapa occupations decreased in the 14th century and there is no evidence of Apishapa occupations after 1400 on the Chaquaqua Plateau. What followed was evidence of tipi villages in the presence of earth rings about 12 feet (3.7 m) in diameter, surrounded by spaced rocks. Archaeological artifacts at the sites include metates, manos, scrapers, gravers, projectile points, and flakes of Alibates chert. See Picture Canyon Tipi ring period.

== See also ==
- Apishapa cultural findings at:
  - Franktown Cave
  - Picture Canyon
  - Trinchera Cave Archeological District
- List of prehistoric sites in Colorado
- Prehistory of Colorado
