= Cord-marked pottery =

Earthenware pottery

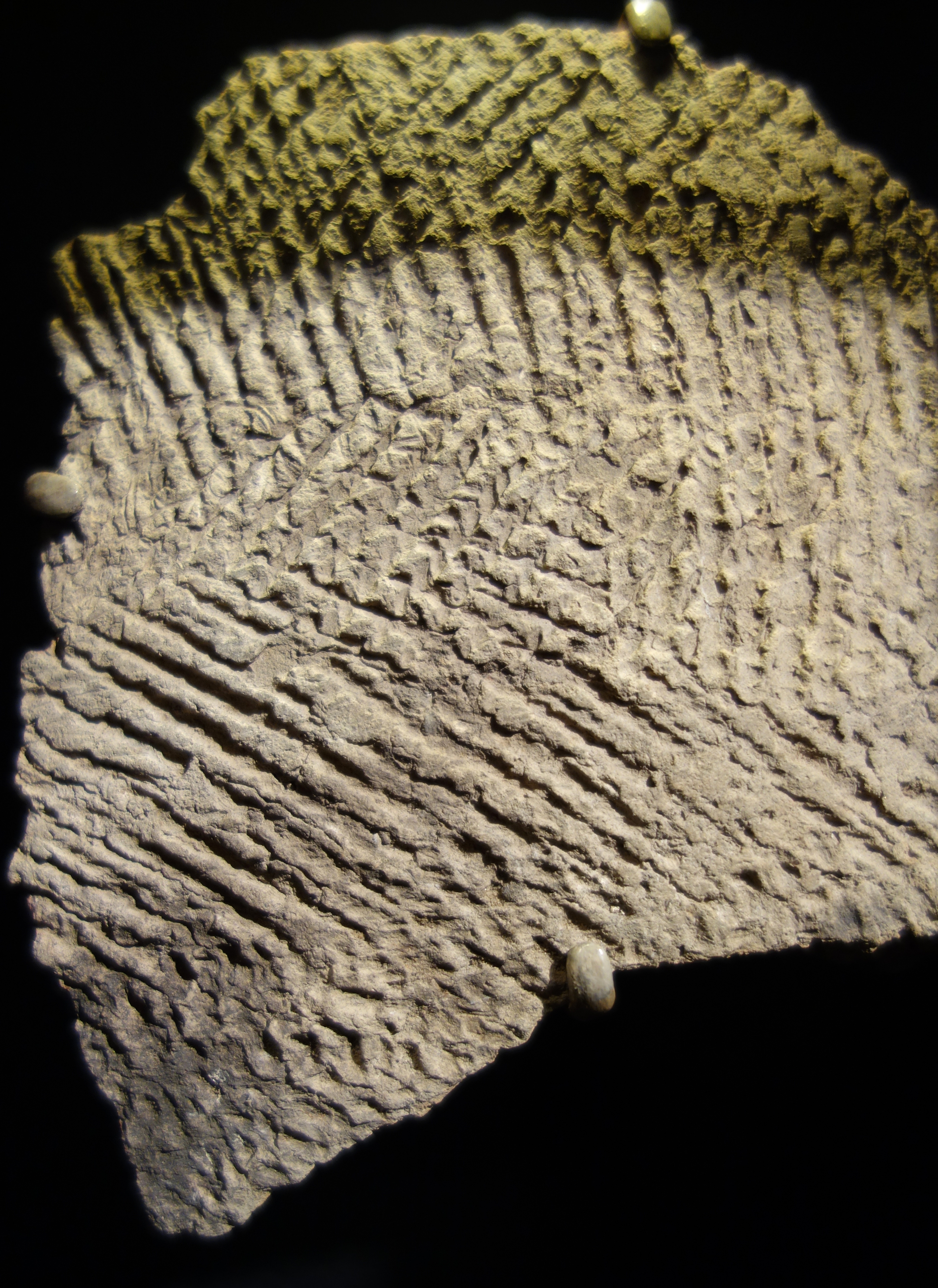
Grog tempered pottery, Wilmington cord marked, Wilmington Period, AD 350–800, Fernbank Museum of Natural History

Cord-marked pottery or cordmarked pottery is an early form of a simple earthenware pottery. It allowed food to be stored and cooked over fire. Cord-marked pottery varied slightly around the world, depending upon the clay and raw materials that were available. It generally coincided with cultures moving to an agrarian and more settled lifestyle, like that of the Woodland period, as compared to a strictly hunter-gatherer lifestyle.

== Making cord-marked pottery ==
Pottery was made by gathering clay from hillsides or streams. Other material—shells, stone, sand, plant fibers, crushed fired clay—added to the clay tempers it to prevent cracking and shrinking when dried and fired. Several methods were used to create the rough shape of the vessel: pinching and shaping, paddling, or coiling, the latter of which means to build up a pot with coils of rolled clay. Layers of coiled clay are then pinched, thinned, and smoothed. Another method, paddling, is accomplished by pounding a lump of clay with a wooden paddle against a large stone. The fabric texture may appear on the side of the pottery if the paddle was covered with fabric. Otherwise, the pot could be created by shaping and pinching a lump of clay.

Cord-marked pottery was then made with a paddle and anvil method that was accomplished by pressing cord-wrapped paddles against the side of the pottery to form and thin the pottery. This was done while holding an anvil stone on the inside of the vessel. The fiber cords prevented the paddles from sticking to the wet clay. This created small, parallel ridges in the pottery. Pottery was then dried for two weeks and fired.

The rough surface that was created made it easy to hold on to the vessels, particularly when wet or greasy. The rough surface also allowed "more effective transfer of heat (energy) from a cooking fire to the contents of the pot compared to a vessel with a smooth exterior."

Mostly three types of impressions are obtained by using (1) single strand cord, (2) double strands twisted cord and (3) knots of thick cord in Maipur. The cords are wrapped around a paddle in the case of the first two types, while the paddle is covered with a net made by tying knots in series of thick cord in the case of the third type.

== Asia ==
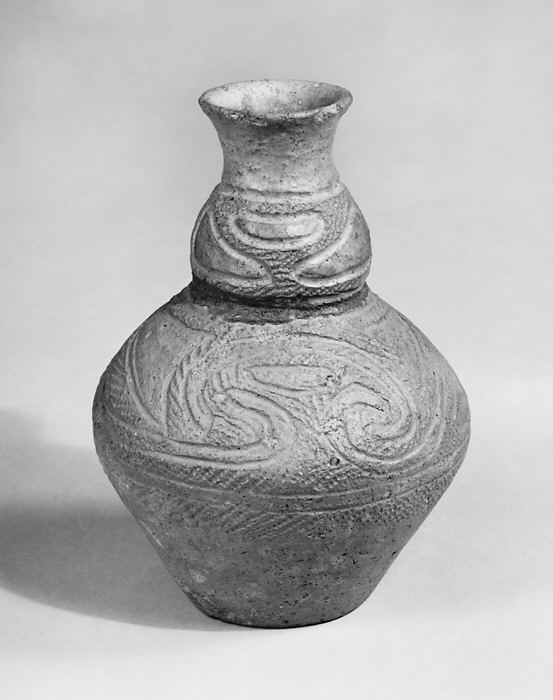
Earthenware with cord-marked and incised decoration (Tokoshinai 5 type), Metropolitan Museum of Art

In Japan, the Jōmon period is named after its cord-marked pottery. The term Jomon was coined by Edward S. Morse who discovered corded ware at the Omori site in 1867. In Taiwan, the Fengpitou (鳳鼻頭) culture, characterized by fine red cord-marked pottery, was found in Penghu and the central and southern parts of the western side of the island, and a culture with similar pottery occupied the eastern coastal areas. Archaeologically, the prehistory of Taiwan can be subdivided into at least four major cultural sequences. From earliest to most recent, these are the Changpin culture, Tapenkeng culture (coarse corded ware culture), fine corded ware culture (red cord-marked ware culture), and the proto-historical culture. There were also the eastern cord-marked cultures of eastern, central, and southern Taiwan. Pottery of the Suntangpu culture consists mainly of jars, bowls, and basins. Three main kinds of pottery: reddish sandy pottery, orange sandy pottery, and orange clay pottery, are recognized from these red cord-marked wares. Reddish Sandy pottery characterized by red coatings and dominant pyroxene tempers is considered most characteristic of Suntangpu culture. Micro-Raman spectroscopy, XRD, and SEM-EDX can be used on corded Ware pottery to unravel mineralogical composition and can also be specifically used on red cord-marked pottery to help determine whether the same raw materials were used in the red coatings and ceramic bodies by ancient Potters.

== North America ==
In North America, cord-marked pottery is believed to have originated in the Eastern United States prior to 1000 BC and was found in the upper Midwestern United States about 500 BC. Over the next 500 years, pottery-making cultures spread west, south, and northwest into the Great Plains, west of the Mississippi, and into Texas and Oklahoma.

Cord-marked pottery was made in several shapes. An inverted cone shape, with a pointed bottom and up to 2 1/2 feet tall, was used for storing food. The walls of the pottery were very thick, and were too heavy to haul food a great distance. This would have been a great improvement over storing food directly underground without a container. Over time, the pottery walls became thinner and rounder as pottery-makers became more skilled, such as during the Plains Village period (c. a. AD 1100–1450). Round shaped or globular pottery meant that the vessels could be steadied on several small stones or placed directly on a fire for cooking. There were also different rim shaped: flared rims, straight rims, or collared, meaning thickened, rims. Fingernail impressions or incised lines were sometimes added for decoration.

Native groups of people created their own styles, based upon the raw materials that they used or the decorations that they added to the pottery. Some used crushed volcanic stone to temper the clay pottery. Decorations were made with punctuations, impressions, and incised lines. During the Luray phase of prehistoric West Virginia shells were used to temper Keyser Cord-marked pottery.

Cord-marked pottery was made in the plains between the early centuries AD and through to the 1700s. Wilmington Cord-Marked, made of clay or grog and tempered with grit or sherd, was found at the mouth of the Savannah River and along the coastal plain of South and North Carolina. The earliest Wilmington pottery was dated to 500 BC. Cord-marked pottery made by Plain Villagers about 900 years ago called Borger Cordmarked Pottery (found at Landergin Mesa), is named for the nearby town of Borger, Texas. It was made by people who lived in the Texas Panhandle along the Canadian River, believed to be people of the Antelope Creek culture from AD 1100 to 1450. Similar pottery was made in the Oklahoma panhandle, southwestern Kansas, and southeastern Colorado. Cord-marked pottery, made by the Apache during the Tipi Ring period has been found at Picture Canyon in Colorado. Pottery designated as white rock cord-marked pottery was obtained at the white rock site, seven miles east of Boulder and thirty miles north of Denver, Colorado in 1948.

== Gallery ==
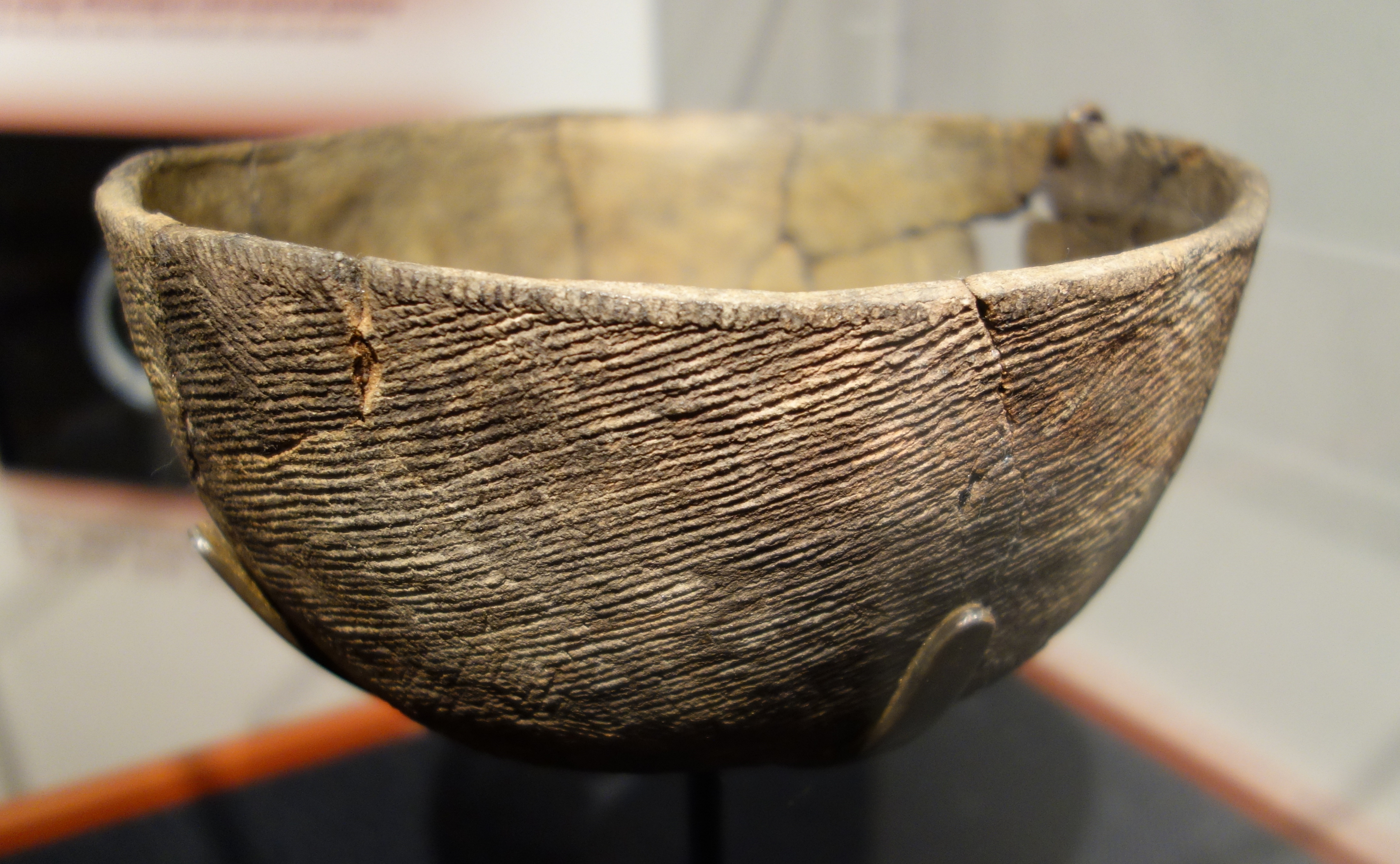
Savannah cord marked bowl, St. Catherines Period, AD 800–1300, Fernbank Museum of Natural History

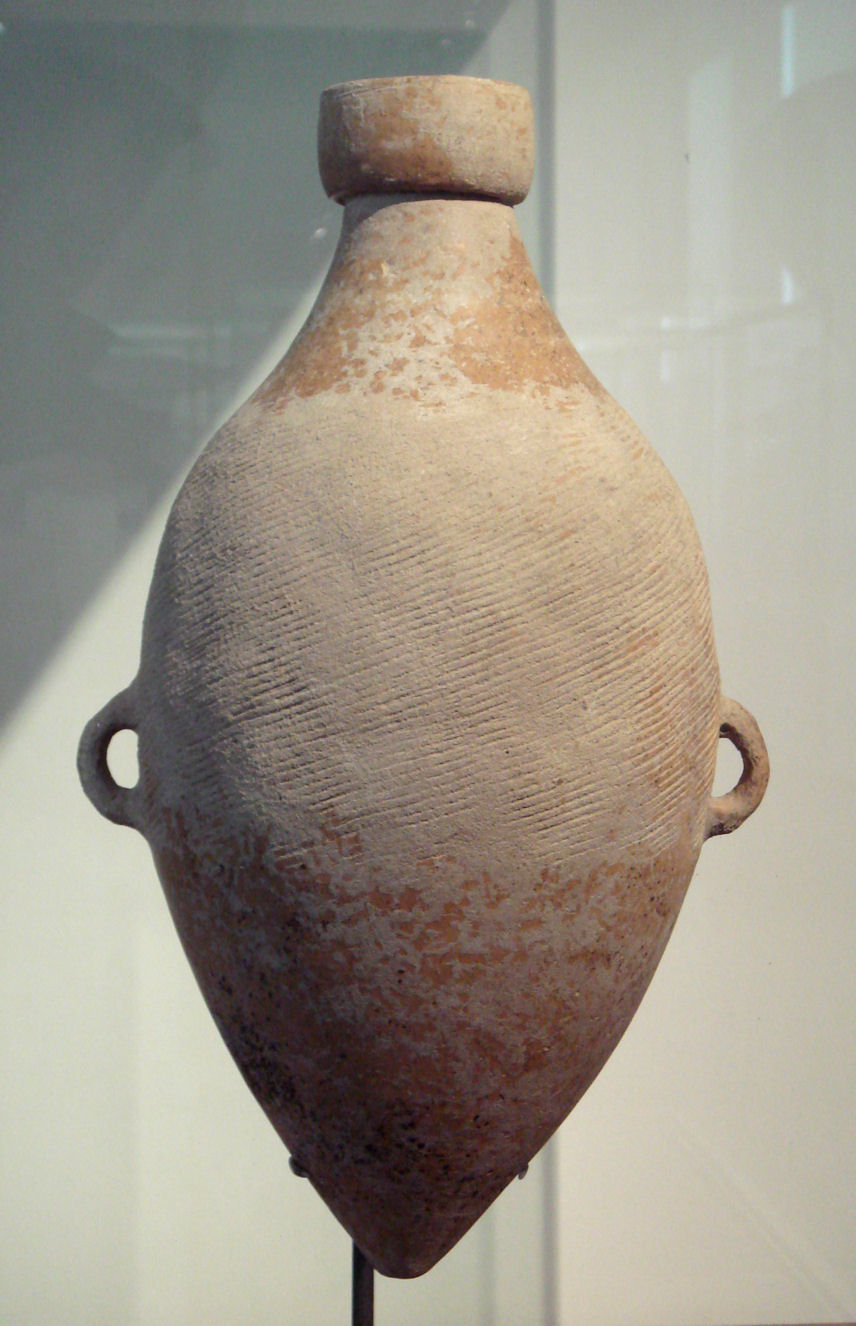
Yangshao cordmarked amphora, Banpo phase, 4800 BC, Shaanxi
