= Cedar Point Village =

Map of Limon, Colorado

Cedar Point Village is an archaeological site located in Elbert County, Colorado near Limon. It is a prehistoric residential site with artifacts of the Dismal River culture and likely inhabited by early Apachean people.

Cedar Point Village, declared "the most spectacular Dismal River site in Colorado," was a small village with 7 round houses. The village was connected to the Dismal River culture through the Dismal River type of pottery and the side-notched, triangular and unnotched projectile points.

The site was excavated in 1952 by Herbert W. Dick, curator of the University of Colorado museum from 1949 to 1953. When Dick left his position at the museum, Joe Ben Wheat led the excavation.

== See also ==
- Franktown Cave, another Dismal River culture site in Colorado
- Jicarilla Apache
- List of prehistoric sites in Colorado
- Prehistory of Colorado
