= Colorado Millennial site =

Archaeological site in Colorado, United States

- Colorado Millennial Site
- U.S. National Register of Historic Places
- U.S. Historic district
- Colorado State Register of Historic Properties
- Location within Colorado Location within the United States
- Location: At the source of Rule Creek, 2 miles (3.2 km) south of the junction of Baca, Bent, and Las Animas counties
- Nearest city: Ruxton
- Coordinates: 37°37′1″N 103°3′43″W
- Area: 94 acres (38 ha)
- NRHP reference No.: 80000877
- CSRHP No.: 5BA.31
- Added to NRHP: April 8, 1980

Colorado Millennial Site is a prehistoric Paleo-Indian archaeological site located near Ruxton in the southeastern part of the U.S. state of Colorado, sitting along the border between Baca and Las Animas counties. It is also known by its site ID, 5LA1115, and the names Hackberry Springs and Bloody Springs.

The site was inhabited from 6999 B.C. to A.D. 1900. The prehistoric cultures included Archaic and Woodland cultures and the site is significant for its rock art, village settlement, and military battle site.

The site, situated along an overhanging bluff, provided natural shelter and had access to a reliable supply of water for its prehistoric inhabitants, who left evidence of their residency in the form of rock art.

The Cheyenne and U.S. 7th Cavalry had the last documented southeastern Colorado military battle with Native Americans at the site in 1868.

== See also ==
- List of prehistoric sites in Colorado
- Prehistory of Colorado
