= Panhandle culture =

Prehistoric culture

- Geographical range: Southern High Plains primarily Oklahoma, Texas
- Period: Middle Ceramic Period
- Dates: AD 1200–1400
- Preceded by: Woodland period

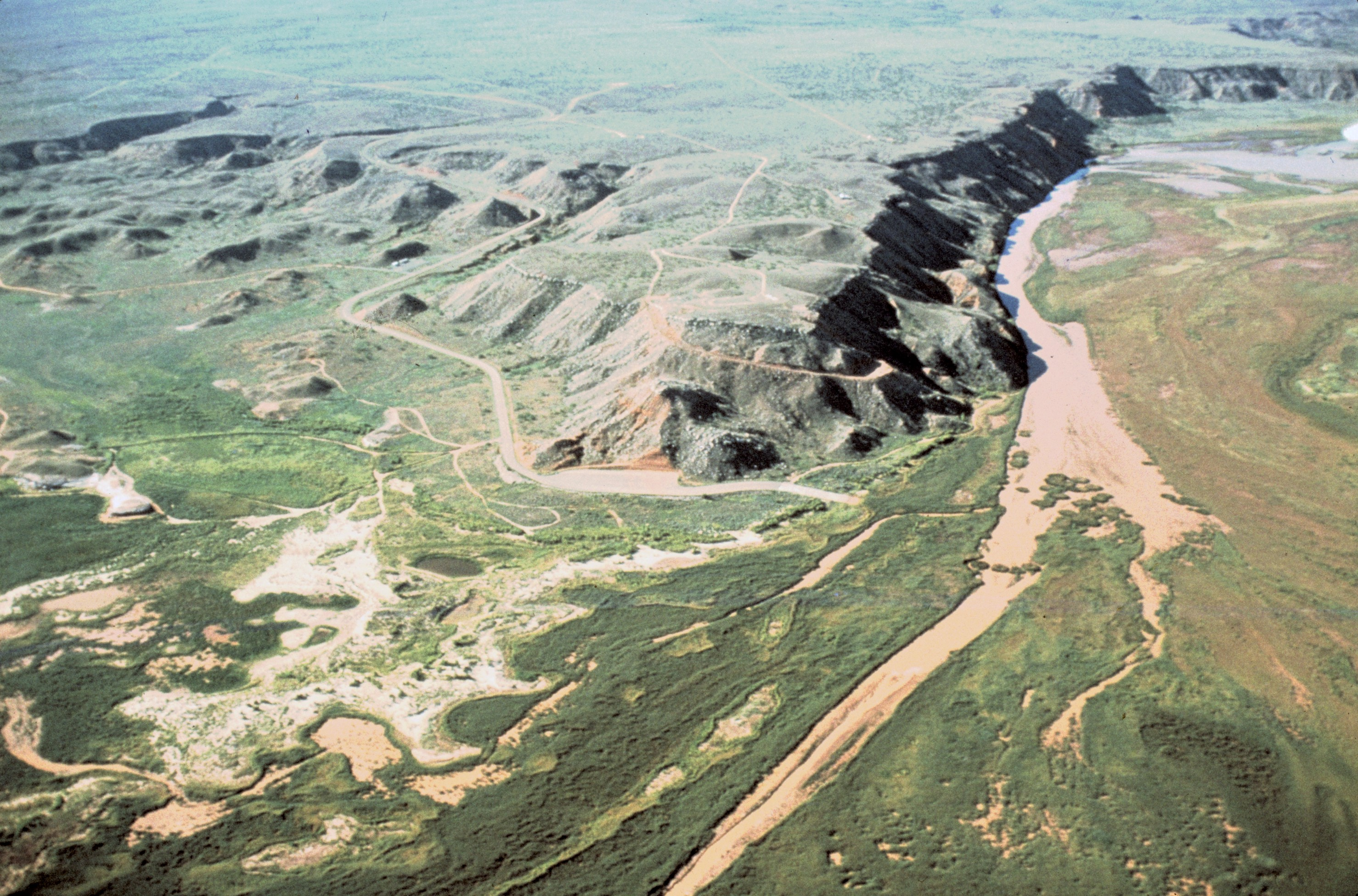
The Canadian River and the Alibates Flint Quarries National Monument. The Antelope Creek People lived mostly on terraces overlooking the river or in side canyons with springs.

Panhandle culture is a prehistoric culture of the southern High Plains during the Middle Ceramic Period from AD 1200 to 1400. Panhandle sites are primarily in the panhandle and west central Oklahoma and the northern half of the Texas panhandle.

The culture was likely an outgrowth of the Woodland phase or a migration of people from north-central Kansas.

== Panhandle focus divisions ==
Antelope Creek focus is the primary, and to some the only, cultural tradition of the panhandle culture. The Optima focus was defined for sites in west central Oklahoma, but after further study, these sites were defined as Antelope Creek focus. In 1975 Robert G. Campbell defined the Apishapa culture of southeastern Colorado's Chaquaqua Plateau as a panhandle culture, which is disputed by other noted archaeologists. The panhandle and other cultures of the Oklahoma and Texas panhandles are sometime grouped together in the Upper Canark variant within a broader range of cultures called the Southern Plains villagers.

== Difficulty defining panhandle culture ==
Several contributing factors have made it difficult to define the panhandle culture, such as discrepancies in reporting carbon dating of artifacts, variations in interpretation of dating information, spotty information, and a lack of published material about the panhandle culture.

== Distinctive traits ==
While it has been difficult to define the time periods and foci of the panhandle culture, there are some distinguishing characteristics:

- Great similarity to the Central Plains complexes
- Some, but much less, evidence of trading or influence of Southwestern pueblo cultures. Their material goods also indicated other trading influences, such as plains pottery, sea-shells, and Smoky Hill Jasper from northwestern Kansas.
- Single or multi-roomed stone structures, often with altars at the back of the structures and posts at four corners of the structure for support. People also camped or used sites with limited purposes.
- People were hunter-gatherers of large and small mammals and wild plants, nuts and fruit. Some farmed.

A primary good for trade for the panhandle culture was Alibates agatized dolomite, such as that found at the Alibates Flint Quarries National Monument.

== Location of panhandle sites ==
Most of the sites are centered on the Canadian River and North Canadian River or its tributaries, primarily Antelope Creek and also Cottonwood Creek, Dixon Creek, and Tarbox Creek. Panhandle culture sites were also found on the Archie King Ranch.
