= Antelope Creek phase =

Historic American Indian culture

The Antelope Creek phase was an American Indian culture in the Texas Panhandle and adjacent Oklahoma dating from AD 1200 to 1450. The two most important areas where the Antelope Creek people lived were in the Canadian River Valley centered on present-day Lake Meredith near the city of Borger, Texas, and the Buried City complex in Wolf Creek Valley near the town of Perryton, Texas. Settlements are also found in Oklahoma near the town of Guymon and along the Beaver River.

The Antelope Creek people were bison hunters, maize farmers, and foragers. They are best known for building large, stone, multifamily dwellings, unique on the Great Plains. Their culture combined characteristics of Southwestern ancestral Pueblo peoples and Great Plains tribes.

The Antelope Creek phase is also called the Antelope Creek focus, the Panhandle phase, the Optima focus, and the Upper Canark variant.

== Origin ==
The Antelope Creek people were the most southwestern of the cultures making up the Plains Village tradition, which stretched from North Dakota to Texas and extended westward in river valleys from the Eastern Woodlands into the Great Plains. The plains villagers adopted the cultivation of corn (maize), and, by AD 900, they were living in semipermanent villages along the watercourses traversing the plains, including, for example, the Washita and Canadian Rivers in Oklahoma. By AD 1250, these river valleys were heavily populated with villages of up to 20 houses situated about every two miles.

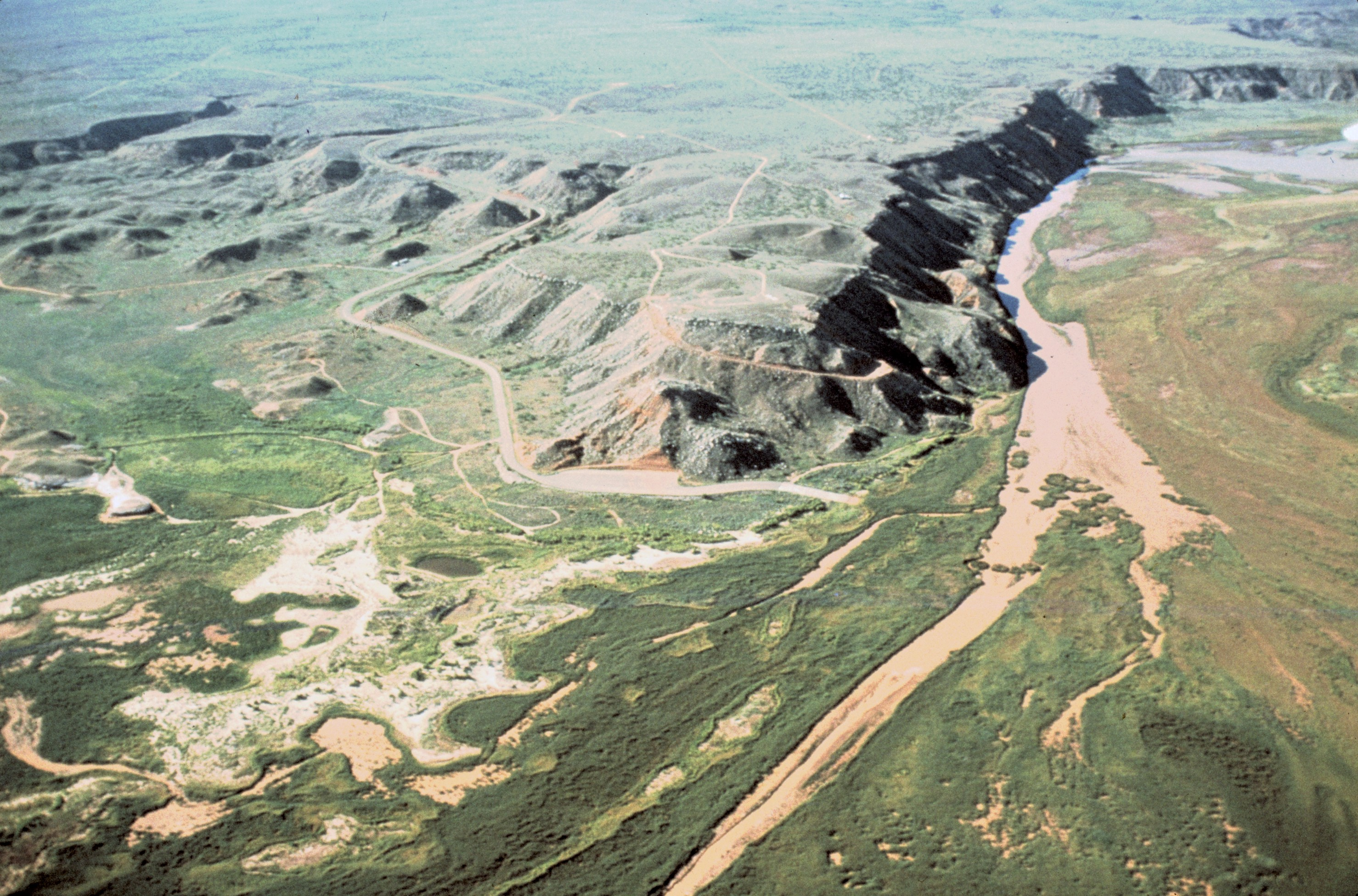
The Canadian River and the Alibates Flint Quarries National Monument: The Antelope Creek people lived mostly on terraces overlooking the river or inside canyons with springs.

Most archaeologists believe that the Antelope Creek phase was a western expansion of farming communities from Oklahoma into the Texas Panhandle or an extension southward of similar farming communities from further north. Although farming was difficult in the dry climate of the Texas Panhandle, other food resources, such as bison, were abundant. Bison or American buffalo are believed to have been uncommon on the Southern Plains before AD 1000. As the bison population expanded thereafter due to climatic conditions, they became the principal source of protein for people on the Southern Plains, and their abundance stimulated a growth in population and complexity of the hunting-gathering societies that had inhabited the region for thousands of years. Archaeological sites confirm increased exploitation of bison after AD 1200.

A major asset of the Canadian River Valley was the large deposits of colorful Alibates flint that could be chipped into tools and weapons and traded to other cultures. The present-day Alibates Flint Quarries National Monument preserves more than 700 quarries where the Indians dug out the flint. Most of the quarries are holes 6 feet or more in diameter and 4 to 8 feet deep. The presence of Alibates flint was undoubtedly an economic incentive to settle nearby to control trade in the stone. Alibates flint tools have been found up to one thousand miles away.

The opinion of most archaeologists is that the Antelope Creek people spoke a Caddoan language and were probably ancestors of the historic Wichita and affiliated tribes, possibly, the Pawnee, based primarily on the fact that in historic times, the farming communities on the Southern Plains were primarily Caddoans. An alternative thesis is that the Antelope Creek people were Pueblo Indians who moved or were pushed onto the Great Plains from their homes near the valley of the Rio Grande in New Mexico. Also, the Antelope Creek people possibly were neither Caddoan nor Puebloan, but an entirely different people, nor is it certain that all the people of the Antelope Creek culture spoke the same language or belonged to the same ethnic group.

Pioneering archaeologist Alex D. Kreiger summed up the evidence: “To attempt to classify Antelope Creek focus as either a Plains or Pueblo culture is infeasible, for it was clearly a combination of both.... One can hardly escape the impression that the peoples of this focus were Plains agriculturalists who pushed southward from one valley to another as far as eastern New Mexico. Here, contact was established with Puebloans who were expanding their territories at the same time.”

== Houses and settlements ==
The unique and enigmatic characteristic of Antelope Creek was the construction of large stone-slab and plaster houses and one-story apartment blocks. Elsewhere on the Great Plains, precontact Indian farmers lived in homes constructed from wood, soil, and straw.

Hundreds of Antelope Creek settlements have been discovered. Archaeologist Christopher Lintz identified 11 different variations of buildings in villages, hamlets, and isolated farmsteads. The most notable buildings were rectangular, single-storied, multiroom structures with up to 30 rooms, which ranged in size up to 60 square meters (roughly 30 by 20 feet). The multiroom dwellings appear to have been constructed between 1200 and 1350. Thereafter, individual dwellings were preferred, often about 6 by 6 m (20 by 20 ft) in size and using the same stone-slab construction methods.

Houses typically consisted of an east-facing vestibule leading to a single square room recessed about 1 ft (30 cm) into the ground. The house was divided into thirds. Along the north and south walls of the house were raised benches or platforms; the hearth was located in the center third of the house at a lower level. A platform or table on the west wall of the house may have been an altar. Storage bins were also located against the west wall, and pits for storage were dug beneath the benches. Four upright wooden posts near the center of the dwelling held up the roof, which was probably sloped and made of intertwined straw and saplings. A large variety existed, though, in the structures built by the Antelope Creek people. The time and effort involved in stone-slab and plaster construction implies confidence by the people in the permanence of their settlements.

Although some Antelope Creek people lived in the multifamily dwellings, more often they clustered in hamlets of individual homes with a population of not more than eight families. Between hamlets were isolated farmsteads of one or two houses. Most dwellings were located on terraces above the Canadian River or near a spring-fed stream or tributary. The population in some areas was dense. The five-mile-long Buried City complex on Wolf Creek has more than 100 dwellings capable of housing 15 to 20 people each. The dwellings are spaced about 100 yards from each other, thus resembling the settlement pattern of an American suburb with houses on large lots. If all these dwellings were occupied at the same time, the population may have been 2,000. Along 50 miles of the Canadian River were more than 300 multifamily dwellings with a population that may have exceeded 10,000. The total population of the Texas Panhandle during the Antelope Creek phase may have totaled as many as 30,000. Water can be scarce on the Great Plains, but beneath the surface is the Ogallala Aquifer. The water of the Canadian River is salty, so the Antelope Creek people often lived where streams had cut 100 to 200 feet deep into the caprock. Springs and small, spring-fed watercourses tapping into the aquifer were abundant and reliable. Timber for building and fuel was found in these valleys and canyons.

== Subsistence ==
The evidence points to a three-faceted strategy for subsistence among the Antelope Creek people: Hunting bison and other animals; cultivation of maize, beans, squash, and sunflowers; and foraging for edible nuts, fruits, and seeds. The relative importance of each of these activities is unclear.

Antelope Creek men probably traveled long distances from their village to hunt bison. Although bison were their most important prey, the bones of deer, antelope, and smaller game have also been found in the ruins, plus a few mussels and fish.

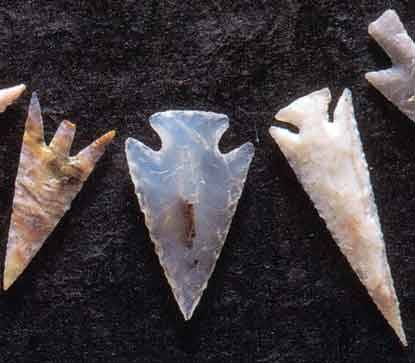
Arrowheads made from Alibates flint

The Antelope Creek people grew corn, beans, squash, and probably sunflowers. The Texas Panhandle is a marginal area for unirrigated agriculture, prone to drought, and with the bulk of the 16- to 20-inch annual rainfall coming in a few thunderstorms that cause flooding. Thus, the Antelope Creek people probably practiced water harvesting or Ak-Chin dryland farming techniques. Crops were planted in arroyos or other depressions that caught runoff from thunderstorms and preserved enough moisture to permit crops to grow and mature. Given the unpredictability of rainfall, a family probably planted small fields, as did other Southwestern peoples, in several different microenvironments with the objective of maximizing the possibility that some of their fields would be productive. In their farming, the Antelope Creek people used bone-tipped digging sticks and bison scapulae as shovels and hoes.

Foraging of wild plants for food was probably important for the Antelope Creek people, particularly because agriculture in the drought-prone panhandle was always hazardous and the abundance of bison varied by season and year. Among the wild foods eaten were acorns, hackberries, mesquite beans, buckwheat, plums, persimmons, prickly pear, mallow, cattail, purslane, goosefoot, knotweed, domesticated marshelder, and bulrush.

Food was often cooked in pottery vessels, which were made locally and also imported—increasingly as time went on—from the Rio Grande Pueblos. Trade increased dramatically after 1350, indicating the growth of a more outward-looking and possibly more mobile Antelope Creek culture.

== The end of Antelope Creek ==
The Antelope Creek settlements were abandoned between 1450 and 1500. When Spanish conquistador Francisco Vásquez de Coronado passed through the Texas Panhandle in 1541, he met only nomadic and seminomadic, buffalo-hunting Indians he called Querechos (Apache) and Teyas (possibly Caddoan).

Several reasons have been advanced for the disappearance of the Antelope Creek people in this region. The first theory is that they exhausted their resources over time and were forced to resettle elsewhere. The second theory is that drought made agriculture increasingly infeasible in the Panhandle, and the Antelope Creek people moved to better agricultural lands. The third is that they were forced out of their homes by other Indians, most likely the Apache, who were new arrivals to the Southern Plains. Whatever the reason, most archaeologists speculate that the Antelope Creek people migrated eastward to Kansas and Oklahoma and became the Wichita and Affiliated Tribes, whom Coronado met in Quivira in 1541. The Pawnee of Nebraska also have an oral history that they once lived in stone houses in the Southwest.
