= Alibates Flint Quarries National Monument =

U.S. national monument in Texas

- IUCN category V (protected landscape/seascape)
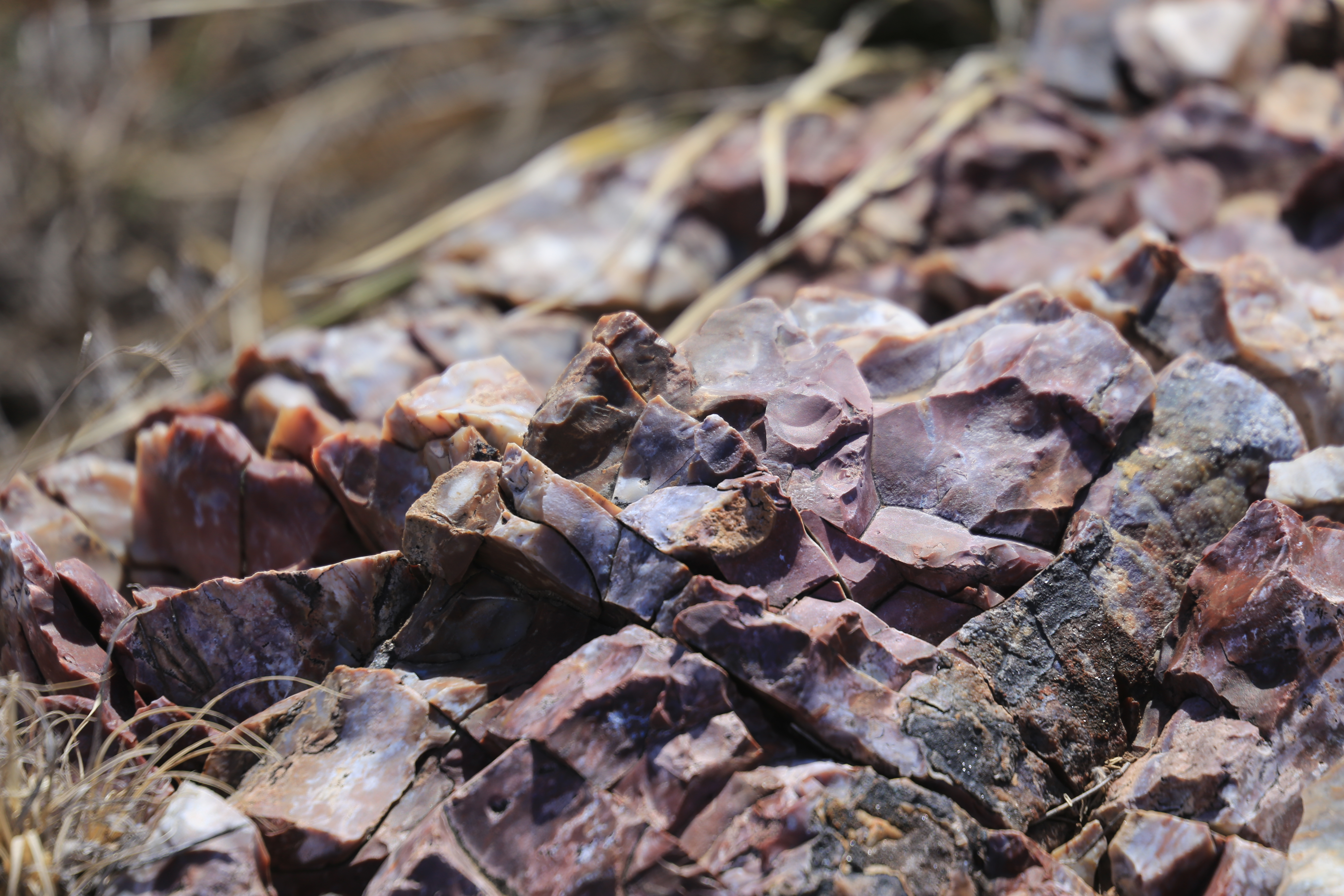
- Quarry at Alibates Flint Quarries

- Location within Texas Location within the United States
- Interactive map of Alibates Flint Quarries National Monument
- Location: Potter County, Texas, USA
- Nearest city: Fritch
- Coordinates: 35°34′30″N 101°41′02″W
- Area: 1,371 acres (5.55 km^{2})
- Authorized: August 31, 1965
- Visitors: 8,054 (in 2025)
- Governing body: National Park Service
- Website: Alibates Flint Quarries National Monument

U.S. National Register of Historic Places
- Designated: October 15, 1966
- Reference no.: 66000822

Alibates Flint Quarries National Monument is a U.S. national monument in the state of Texas. For thousands of years, people came to the red bluffs above the Canadian River for flint, vital to their existence. Demand for the high-quality, rainbow-hued flint is reflected in the distribution of Alibates flint through the Great Plains and beyond. Native Americans of the Ice Age Clovis culture used Alibates flint for spear points to hunt the Columbian mammoth before the Great Lakes were formed. The flint usually lies just below the surface at ridge level in a layer up to 6 ft thick. The quarry pits were not very large, between 5 and 25 ft wide and 4 to 7 ft deep. Many of these quarries were exploited by the Antelope Creek people of the Panhandle culture between 1200 and 1450 AD. The stone-slabbed, multiroom houses built by the Antelope Creek people have long been of interest to the public and studied by archaeologists. Today, this area is protected by the U.S. National Park Service and can only be viewed by ranger-led guided tours, which must be reserved in advance.

Alibates Flint Quarries was the only national monument in the state of Texas until the Military Working Dog Teams National Monument was created in 2013, and is adjacent to and managed together with Lake Meredith National Recreation Area.

The monument was authorized as Alibates Flint Quarries and Texas Panhandle Pueblo Culture National Monument on August 31, 1965, but the designation was shortened to the current name on November 10, 1978.

== See also ==
- National Register of Historic Places listings in Potter County, Texas
