= Picture Canyon (Colorado) =

Canyon in Colorado, United States

Coordinates: 37.0097°N 102.7484°W

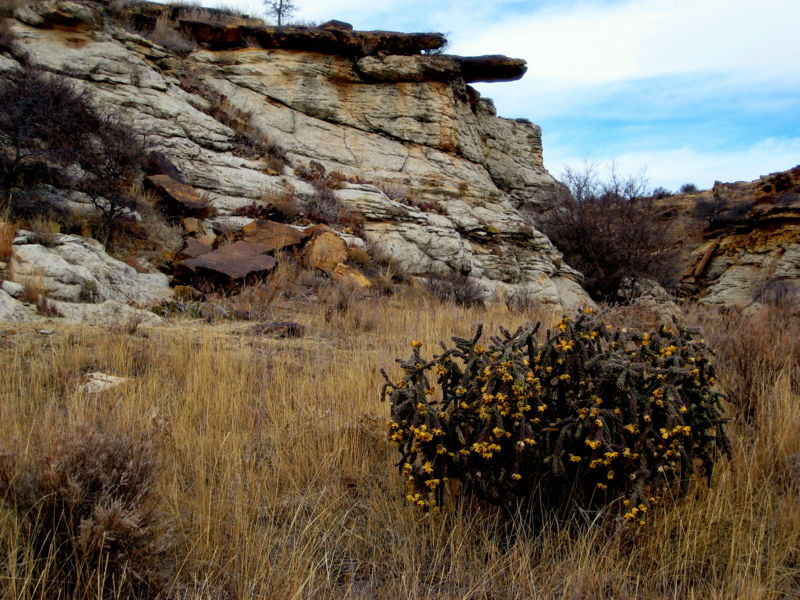
Picture Canyon is typical of the canyons in the Comanche National Grassland.

Picture Canyon, located in the Comanche National Grassland in southeastern Colorado, was named for its prehistoric rock art. There is evidence of prehistoric inhabitation of sites in Picture Canyon by Paleo-Indian, Archaic and Post-Archaic cultures, from about 12,000 years ago to 400 years ago. In addition to rock art, there are also carvings in walls that are used to identify the entry into fall and spring equinoxes.

== Recreation area ==
It is a small canyon with easy slopes, springs, picnic tables, and a loop hiking trail 4 miles (6.4 km) long. Natural attractions include rock formations, such as Balanced Rock, and Crack Cave.

== Archaeological site ==
=== Paleo-Indian ===
Projectile points found in the Comanche National Grasslands are estimated to be 12,000 years old, evidence of Paleo-Indian hunters.

=== Plains Archaic Period ===
Rock shelters have been found in Picture Canyon and other nearby locations by hunter-gatherers from the Plains Archaic Period, from 250 B.C. to A.D. 500. Most of the shelters were near sources of water and faced south, which would have been warmed by the sun in the winter. Material goods found in the shelters include metates and manos, stitching awls, abraders, hammerstones, knives, and scrapers. Some of the rock shelters contained rock art.

=== Plains Woodland Period ===
While there is some evidence of rock shelter inhabitation by the Plains Woodland culture, the primary evidence is found in open-air sites. The dwellings were simple structures made of stone slaps or brush. Some sites show evidence of farming. Material goods found include corner-notched projectile points used for bow and arrow hunting and cord-marked Woodland grit-tempered pottery.

=== Apishapa culture ===
The Apishapa lived on the canyon rim and farmed on the canyon floor. Their homes, built on the lowest portion of a mesa or above the creek flood plains, provided great visibility in three directions and easy access to the farmland. The dwellings were round or oval structures, 15 to 21 feet (4.6 to 6.4 m) in diameter, were built in groupings of 3 to 4 buildings. They were covered by wooden poles, brush and possibly animal hides and contained hearths up to 19 feet (5.8 m) wide for cooking and warmth. Material goods included metates and manos for processing acorn and maize, and tools made of imported chert, obsidian and petrified wood. The Apishapa lived in the dwellings during spring planting and fall harvesting.

=== Tipi ring period ===
The possible ancestors of the Apache built tipis in the area about A.D. 1350, during what is called the "Tipi ring period" with sites of up to 44 tipi rings and circular arrangement of stones. The sites were located along canyon rims and at canyon heads for short periods of time, likely only for several days to several weeks. The limited material goods found include beads made of imported turquoise, cord-marked pottery, imported San Lazaro Glaze Polychrome pottery made during the Ancient Pueblo People Pueblo IV Era and, in one site, Taos Pueblo or Picuris Pueblo mica tempered pottery made after A.D. 1500.

== Rock art and solar markings ==
The south canyon walls of Picture Canyon contain rock art, red and black pictographs and human and animal petroglyphs, that were likely made by Plains Indians in the 17th and early 18th centuries. Horizontal lines of writing were found there, similar to 50 sites in Oklahoma and southeastern Colorado, which have been translated to include solar, planting and travel related information.

Markings in the walls of Crack Cave were made more than 1,000 years ago which are illuminated by rays of the sun during the spring and autumn equinox. Free tours are conducted by the National Forest Service on equinox dates in March and September.
