= Mount Albion complex =

The Mount Albion complex was an early Archaic culture from about 4050 to 3050 BC, particularly distinguished by the Mount Albion side-notched projectile. It was called by James Gunnerson, the best known early Archaic culture in Colorado. It is related or similar to the Albion Boarding House phase.

The Hungry Whistler Site and 5BL70 sites, on the slopes of Mount Albion in Boulder County, are the greatest sources of information about the Mount Albion complex. Hungry Whistler, a kill and butchering site, at 11,500 feet (3,500 m) is the type site for the Mount Albion complex. Hunters used a game drive system on the site to drive game between stone walls. The archaeological findings were dated over four periods from about 3850 to 3060 B.C. Site 5BL70, located near Hungry Whistler at 11,368 feet (3,465 m), was used as a campsite and a place to gather wild plants. Stone tools were also made there. It was inhabited twice, once about 3700 B.C. and again about 3400 B.C.

LoDaisKa site, Magic Mountain, Mount Albion, Helmer Ranch in Douglas County, and Yarmony House in Eagle County, Colorado, are examples of the Mount Albion complex.
