= History of Arizona =

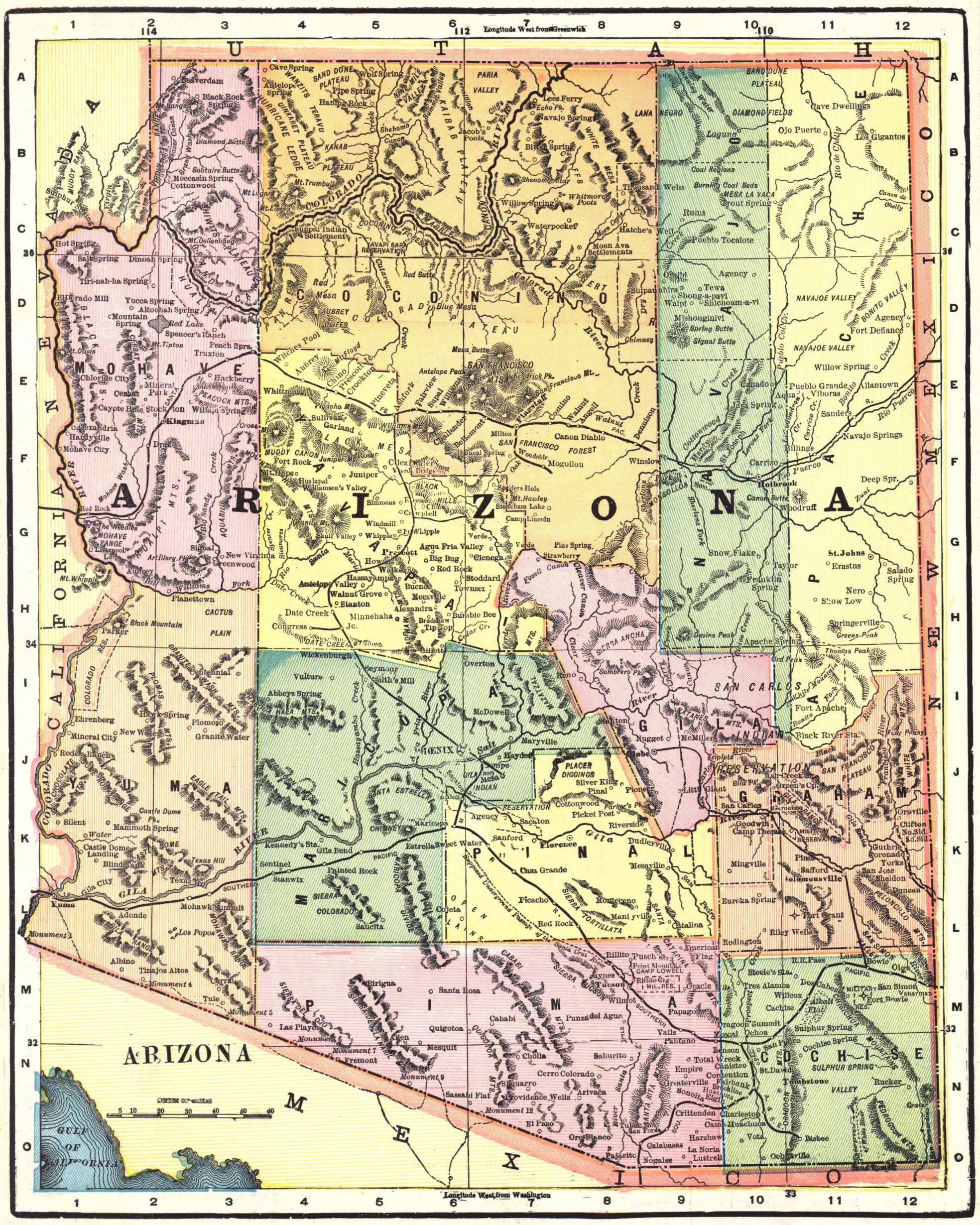
1898 map of the Arizona Territory

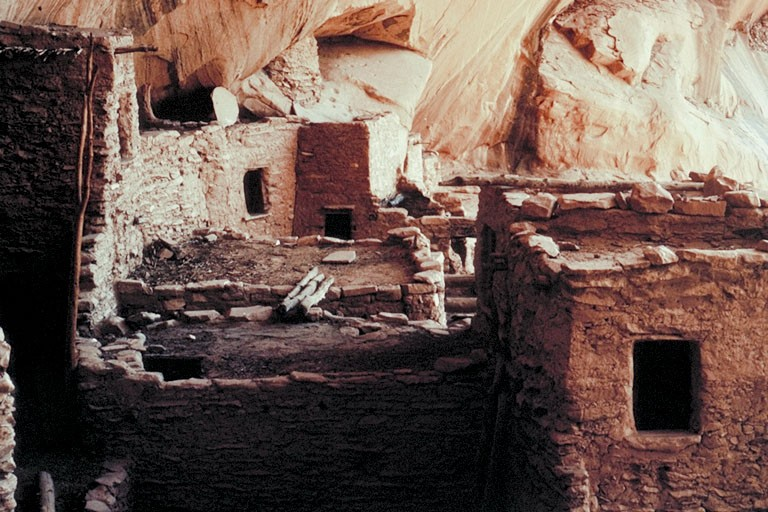
Keet Seel cliff dwellings

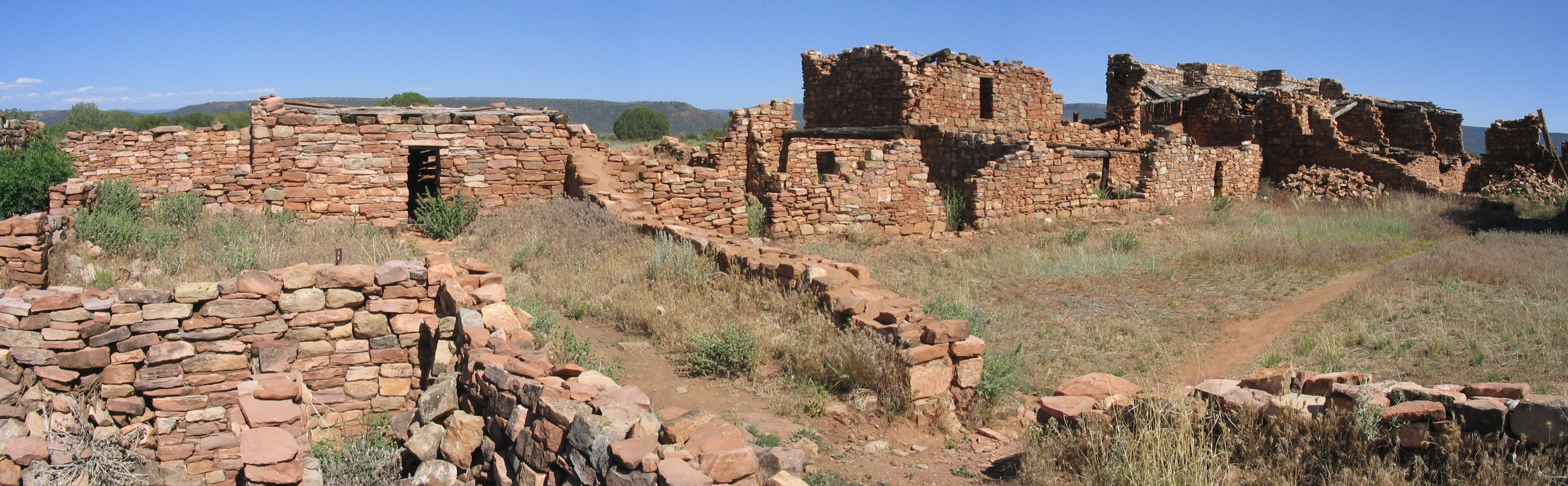
Panorama of Kinishba Ruins, an ancient Mogollon great house. The Kinishba Ruins are one building that has over 600 rooms.

Historical population
Census	Pop.	Note	%±
1860	6,482		—
1870	9,658		49.0%
1880	40,440		318.7%
1890	88,243		118.2%
1900	122,931		39.3%
1910	204,354		66.2%
1920	334,162		63.5%
1930	435,573		30.3%
1940	499,261		14.6%
1950	749,587		50.1%
1960	1,302,161		73.7%
1970	1,745,944		34.1%
1980	2,718,215		55.7%
1990	3,665,228		34.8%
2000	5,130,632		40.0%
2010	6,392,017		24.6%
Sources: 1910–2010

The history of Arizona encompasses the Paleo-Indian, Archaic, Post-Archaic, Spanish, Mexican, and American periods. About 10,000 to 12,000 years ago, Paleo-Indians settled in what is now Arizona. A few thousand years ago, the Ancestral Puebloan, the Hohokam, the Mogollon and the Sinagua cultures inhabited the state. However, all of these civilizations mysteriously disappeared from the region in the 15th and 16th centuries. Today, countless ancient ruins can be found in Arizona. Arizona was part of the state of Sonora, Mexico from 1822, but the settled population was small. In 1848, under the terms of the Mexican Cession the United States took possession of Arizona north of the Gila River. It became part of the Territory of New Mexico. In 1854 the United States purchased the part of the Arizona south of the Gila River, which later allowed a rail connection from Yuma to El Paso.

In 1863, Arizona was split off from the Territory of New Mexico to form the Arizona Territory. The remoteness of the region ended with the arrival of railroads in 1880. Arizona became a state in 1912. It was primarily rural with an economy based on cattle, cotton, citrus, and copper. Dramatic growth came after 1945, as retirees and young families who appreciated the warm weather and low costs emigrated from the Northeast and Midwest. By the 1990s many new arrivals came, increasing the population dramatically, particularly in the metropolitan Phoenix area.

== Paleo-Indian period ==
Paleo-Indians settled what is now Arizona around 10,000 to 12,000 years ago. According to most archaeologists, the Paleo-Indians initially followed herds of big game—megafauna such as mammoths, mastodons, and bison—into North America. The traveling groups also collected and utilized a wide variety of smaller game animals, fish, and a wide variety of plants. These people were likely characterized by highly mobile bands of approximately 20 or 50 members of an extended family, moving from place to place as resources were depleted and additional supplies needed. Paleoindian groups were efficient hunters and created and carried a variety of tools, some highly specialized, for hunting, butchering and hide processing. These paleolithic people utilized the environment that they lived in near water sources, including rivers, swamps and marshes, which had an abundance of fish, and drew birds and game animals. Big game, including bison, mammoths and ground sloths, also were attracted to these water sources. At the latest by 9500 BCE, bands of hunters wandered as far south as Arizona, where they found a desert grassland and hunted mule deer, antelope and other small mammals.

As populations of larger game began to diminish, possibly as a result of intense hunting and rapid environmental changes, Late Paleoindian groups would come to rely more on other facets of their subsistence pattern, including increased hunting of bison, mule deer and antelope. Nets and the atlatl to hunt water fowl, ducks, small animals and antelope. Hunting was especially important in winter and spring months when plant foods were scarce.

[null]

== Archaic period ==
The Archaic time frame is defined culturally as a transition from a hunting/gathering lifestyle to one involving agriculture and permanent, if only seasonally occupied, settlements. In the Southwest, the Archaic is generally dated from 8000 years ago to approximately 1800 to 2000 years ago. During this time the people of the southwest developed a variety of subsistence strategies, all using their own specific techniques. The nutritive value of weed and grass seeds was discovered and flat rocks were used to grind flour to produce gruels and breads. This use of grinding slabs in about 7500 BCE marks the beginning of the Archaic tradition. Small bands of people traveled throughout the area, gathering plants such as cactus fruits, mesquite beans, acorns, and pine nuts and annually establishing camps at collection points.

Late in the Archaic Period, corn, probably introduced into the region from central Mexico, was planted near camps with permanent water access. Distinct types of corn have been identified in the more well-watered highlands and the desert areas, which may imply local mutation or successive introduction of differing species. Emerging domesticated crops also included beans and squash.

About 3,500 years ago, climate change led to changing patterns in water sources, leading to a dramatically decreased population. However, family-based groups took shelter in south facing caves and rock overhangs within canyon walls. Occasionally, these people lived in small semisedentary hamlets in open areas. Evidence of significant occupation has been found in the northern part of Arizona.

Archaic cultural traditions include:

- Archaic–Early Basketmaker (7000–1500 BCE)
- San Dieguito–Pinto (6500 BCE – 200 CE)
- Oshara (5500 BCE – 600 CE)
- Cochise (before 5000 BCE – 200 CE)
- Chihuahua (6000 BCE –250 CE)

== Post-Archaic period ==
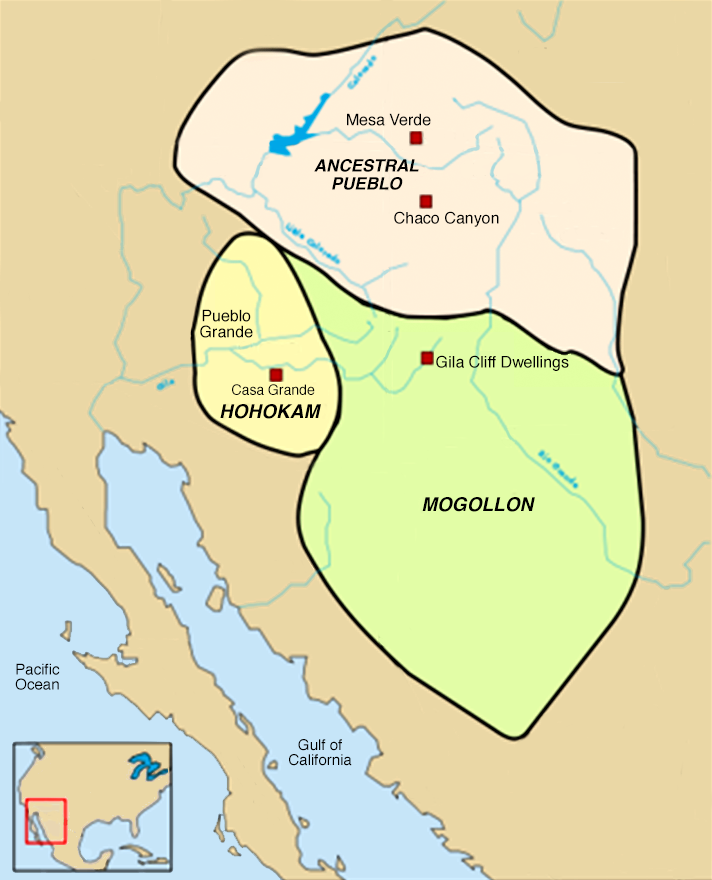
A map showing the extent of the Ancestral Puebloan, Hohokam, and Mogollon cultures within the American Southwest and Northern Mexico, all three of which were based in what is now Arizona and/or New Mexico in around 1350 CE

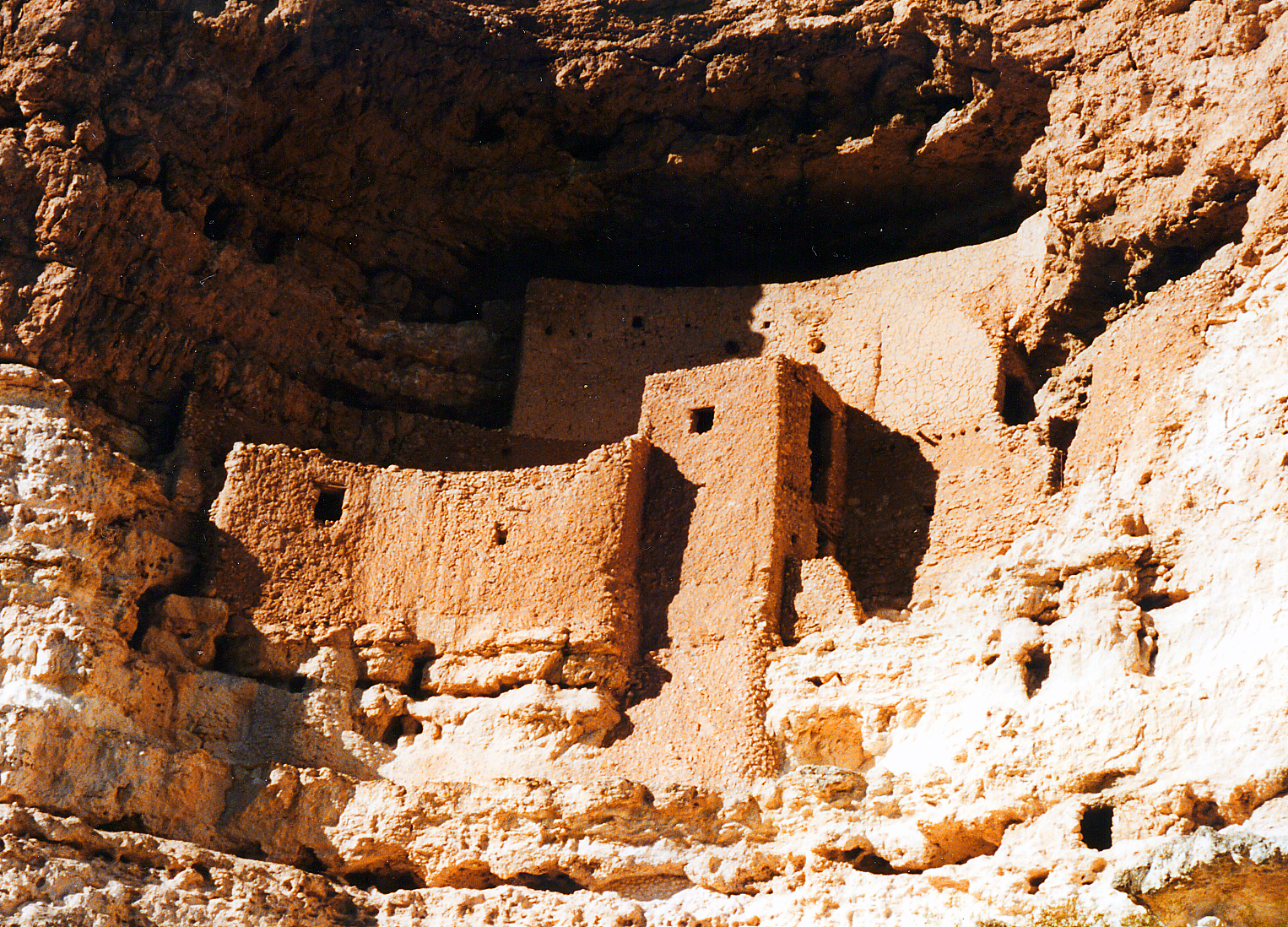
Sinagua cliff dwelling (Montezuma Castle), Arizona, built in around 1100 CE

In the Post-Archaic period, the Ancestral Puebloan, the Hohokam, the Mogollon and Sinagua cultures inhabited what is now Arizona. These cultures built structures made out of stone. Some of the structures that these cultures built are called pueblos. Pueblos are monumental structures that housed dozens to thousands of people. In some Ancestral Puebloan towns and villages, Hohokam towns and villages, Mogollon towns and villages, and Sinagua towns and villages, the pueblo housed the entire town. Surrounding the pueblos were often farms where farmers would plant and harvest crops to feed the community. Sometimes, pueblos and other buildings were built in caves in cliffs.

=== Ancestral Puebloans ===
The Ancestral Puebloans were an ancient Pre-Columbian Native American civilization that spanned the present-day Four Corners region of the United States, comprising southeastern Utah, northeastern Arizona, northwestern New Mexico, and southwestern Colorado. The Ancestral Puebloans are believed to have developed, at least in part, from the Oshara tradition, who developed from the Picosa culture.

They lived in a range of structures that included small family pit houses, larger structures to house clans, grand pueblos, and cliff-sited dwellings for defense. The Ancestral Puebloans possessed a complex network that stretched across the Colorado Plateau linking hundreds of communities and population centers. They held a distinct knowledge of celestial sciences that found form in their architecture. The kiva, a congregational space that was used chiefly for ceremonial purposes, was an integral part of this ancient people's community structure. Some of their most impressive structures were built in what is now Arizona.

=== Hohokam ===
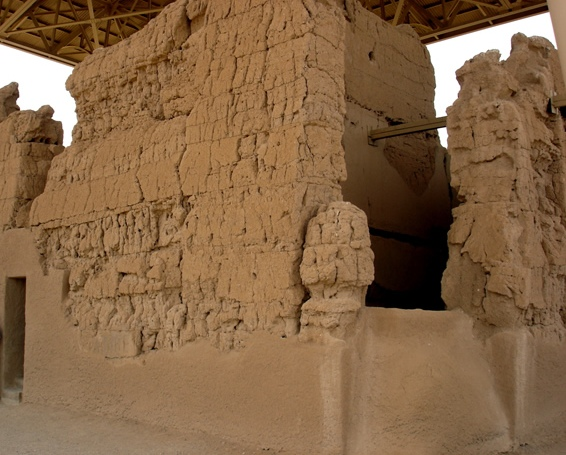
The Great House at the Casa Grande Ruins National Monument

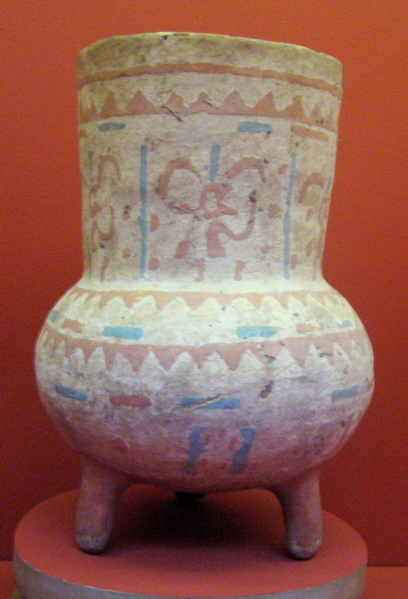
Hohokam pottery from Casa Grande

Hohokam (/hoʊhoʊˈkɑːm/) was a Pre-Columbian culture in the North American Southwest in what is now part of Arizona, United States, and Sonora, Mexico. Hohokam practiced a specific culture, sometimes referred to as Hohokam culture, which has been distinguished by archeologists. People who practiced the culture can be called Hohokam as well, but more often, they are distinguished as Hohokam people to avoid confusion.

Most archaeologists agree that the Hohokam culture existed between c. 300 and c. 1450 CE, but cultural precursors may have been in the area as early as 300 BC. Whether Hohokam culture was unified politically remains under controversy. Hohokam culture may have just given unrelated neighboring communities common ground to help them to work together to survive their harsh desert environment.

=== Mogollon ===
The Mogollon culture (/ˌmoʊɡəˈjoʊn/) was an ancient Pre-Columbian culture of Native American peoples from Southern New Mexico and Arizona, Northern Sonora and Chihuahua, and Western Texas. The northern part of this region is Oasisamerica, while the southern span of the Mogollon culture is known as Aridoamerica.

The Mogollon culture was one of the major prehistoric Southwestern cultural divisions of the Southwestern United States and Northern Mexico. The culture flourished from c. 200 CE, to c. 1450 CE or 1540 CE, when the Spanish arrived.

=== Sinagua ===
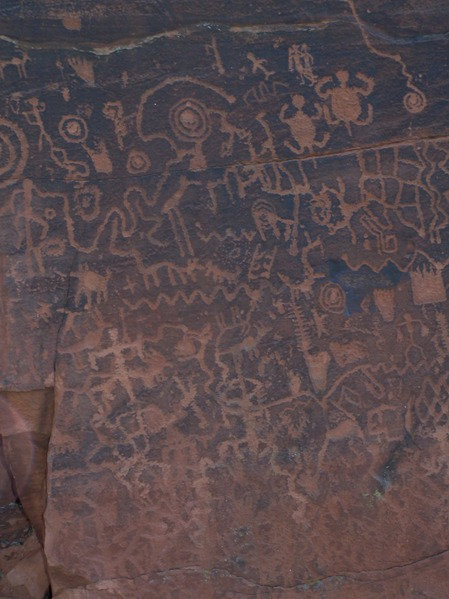
Sinagua petroglyphs at the V Bar V Heritage Site

The Sinagua culture was a Pre-Columbian culture that occupied a large area in central Arizona from the Little Colorado River, near Flagstaff, to the Verde River, near Sedona, including the Verde Valley, area around San Francisco Mountain, and significant portions of the Mogollon Rim country, between approximately 500 CE and 1425 CE. Besides ceremonial kivas, their pueblos had large "community rooms" and some featured ballcourts and walled courtyards, similar to those of the Hohokam culture. Since fully developed Sinagua sites emerged in central Arizona around 500 CE, it is believed they migrated from east-central Arizona, possibly emerging from the Mogollon culture.

== Spanish and Mexican Arizona ==
The history of Arizona as recorded by Europeans began in 1539 with the first documented exploration of the area by Marcos de Niza, early work expanded the following year when Francisco Vásquez de Coronado entered the area as well.

The Spanish established a few missions in southern Arizona in the 1680s by Father Eusebio Francisco Kino along the Santa Cruz River, in what was then the Pimería Alta region of Sonora. The Spanish also established presidios in Tubac and Tucson in 1752 and 1775. The area north of the Gila River was governed by the Province of Las California under the Spanish until 1804, when the Californian portion of Arizona became part of Alta California under the Spanish and Mexican governments.

== American Arizona ==
The Gadsden Purchase (shown with present-day state boundaries and cities)

Arizona Territory in 1866

In the Mexican–American War, the garrison commander avoided conflict with Lieutenant Colonel Cooke and the Mormon Battalion, withdrawing while the Americans marched through the town on their way to California. In the Treaty of Guadalupe Hidalgo (1848), Mexico ceded to the U.S. the northern 70% of modern-day Arizona above the Sonora border along the Gila River.

During the California Gold Rush, upwards of 50,000 people traveled through on the Southern Emigrant Trail pioneered by Cooke, to reach the gold fields in 1849. The Pima Villages often sold fresh food and provided relief to distressed travelers among this throng and to others in subsequent years.

In 1853, President Franklin Pierce sent James Gadsden to Mexico City to negotiate with Santa Anna, and the United States bought the remaining southern strip area of Arizona and New Mexico in the Gadsden Purchase. A treaty was signed in Mexico in December 1853, and then, with modifications, approved by the US Senate in June 1854, setting the southern boundary of Arizona and of New Mexico.

Before 1846 the Apache Indians expelled most Mexican ranchers. One result was that large herds of wild cattle roamed southeastern Arizona. By 1850, the herds were gone, killed by Apaches, American sportsmen, contract hunting for the towns of Fronteras and Santa Cruz, and roundups to sell to hungry Mexican War soldiers, and forty-niners en route to California.

=== Civil War ===
During the Civil War, on March 16, 1861, some residents in southern New Mexico Territory around Mesilla (now in New Mexico) and Tucson invited take-over by the Confederacy. These secessionists hoped that a Confederate Territory of Arizona (CSA) would take control, but in March 1862, Union troops from California recaptured the so-called "Confederate Territory of Arizona" and returned it to the New Mexico Territory.

The Battle of Picacho Pass, April 15, 1862, was a battle of the Civil War fought in the CSA and one of many battles to occur in Arizona during the war among three sides—Apaches, Confederates and Union forces. In 1863, the U.S. split up New Mexico along a north–south line to create the Arizona Territory. The first government officials to arrive established the territory capital in Prescott in 1864. The capital was later moved to Tucson, back to Prescott, and then to its final location in Phoenix in a series of controversial moves as different regions of the territory gained and lost political influence with the growth and development of the territory.

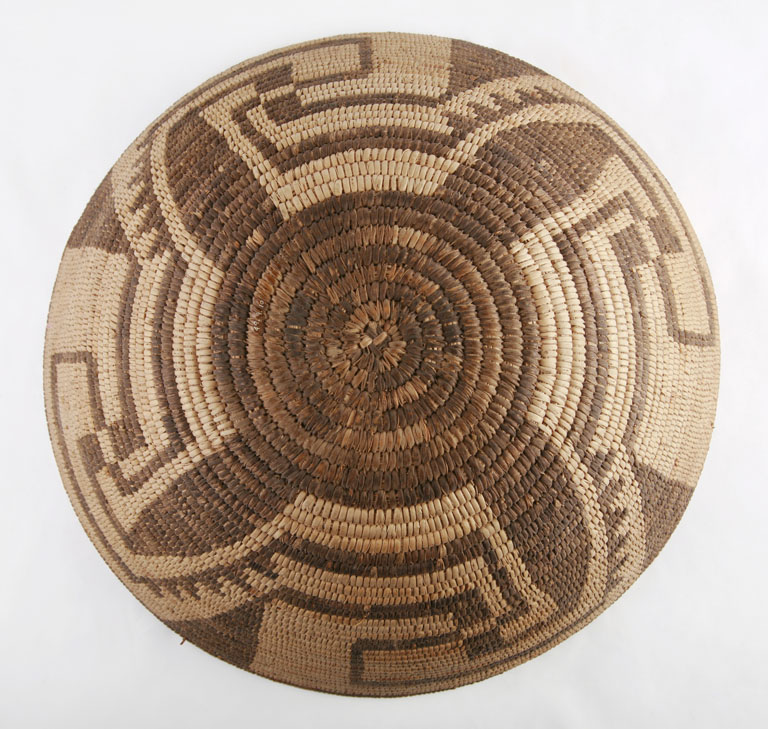
This ornate grain basket by Akimel O'odham dates from the early 20th century, showing the Native American dimension to the state's culture

=== Native American relations ===
In the late 19th century the Army built a series of forts to encourage the Natives to stay in their territory and to act as a buffer from the settlers. The first was Fort Defiance. It was established on September 18, 1851, by Col. Edwin V. Sumner to create a military presence in Diné bikéyah (Navajo territory). Sumner broke up the fort at Santa Fe for this purpose, creating the first military post in what is now Arizona. He left Major Electus Backus in charge. Small skirmishes were common between raiding Navajo and counter raiding citizens. In April 1860 one thousand Navajo warriors under Manuelito attacked the fort and were beaten off.

The fort was abandoned at the start of the Civil War but was reoccupied in 1863 by Colonel Kit Carson and the 1st New Mexico Infantry. Carson was tasked by Brigadier-General James H. Carleton, Commander of the Federal District of New Mexico, to kill Navajo men, destroy crops, wells, houses and livestock. These tactics forced 9000 Navajos to take the Long Walk to a reservation at Bosque Redondo, New Mexico. The Bosque was a complete failure. In 1868 the Navajo signed another treaty and were allowed to go back to part of their former territory. The returning Navajo were restocked with sheep and other livestock. Fort Defiance was the agency for the new Navajo reservation until 1936; today it provides medical services to the region.

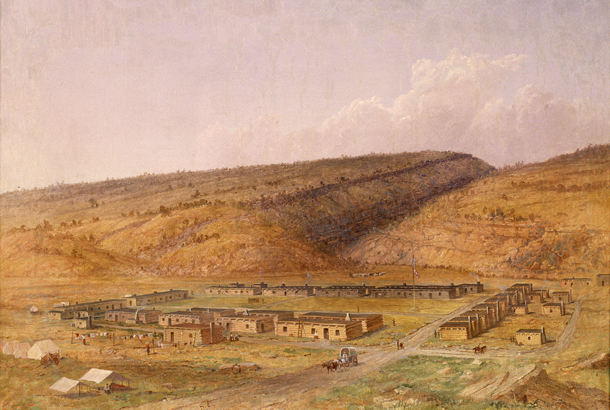
Fort Defiance, painted 1873 by Seth Eastman

Fort Apache was built on the Fort Apache Indian Reservation by soldiers from the 1st Cavalry and 21st Infantry in 1870. Only one small battle took place, in September 1881, with three soldiers wounded. When the reservation Indians were granted U.S. citizenship in 1924, the fort was permanently closed down. Fort Huachuca, east of Tucson, was founded in 1877 as the base for operations against Apaches and raiders from Mexico. From 1913 to 1933 the fort was the base for the "Buffalo Soldiers" of the 10th Cavalry Regiment. During World War II, the fort expanded to 25,000 soldiers, mostly in segregated all-black units. Today the fort remains in operation and houses the U.S. Army Intelligence Center and the U.S. Army Network.

The Pueblos in Arizona were relatively peaceful through the Navajo and Apache Wars. However, in June 1891, the army had to bring in troops to stop Oraibi from preventing a school from being built on their mesa.

=== Ranching ===
After the Civil War, Texans brought large-scale ranching to southern Arizona. They introduced their proven range methods to the new grass country. Texas rustlers also came, and brought lawlessness. Inexperienced ranchers brought poor management, resulting in overstocking, and introduced destructive diseases. Local cattleman organizations were formed to handle these problems. The Territory experienced a cattle boom in 1873–91, as the herds were expanded from 40,000 to 1.5 million head. However, the drought of 1891–93 killed off over half the cattle and produced severe overgrazing. Efforts to restore the rangeland between 1905 and 1934 had limited success, but ranching continued on a smaller scale.

Arizona's last major drought occurred during Dust Bowl years of 1933–34. This time Washington stepped in as the Agricultural Adjustment Administration spent $100 million to buy up the starving cattle. The Taylor Grazing Act placed federal and state agencies in control of livestock numbers on public lands. Most of the land in Arizona is owned by the federal government which leased grazing land to ranchers at low cost. Ranchers invested heavily in blooded stock and equipment. James Wilson states that after 1950, higher fees and restrictions in the name of land conservation caused a sizable reduction in available grazing land. The ranchers had installed three-fifths of the fences, dikes, diversion dams, cattleguards, and other improvements, but the new rules reduced the value of that investment. In the end, Wilson believes, sportsmen and environmentalists maintained a political advantage by denouncing the ranchers as political corrupted land-grabbers who exploited the publicly owned natural resources.

=== Copper ===
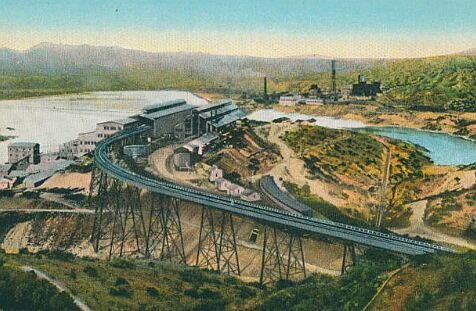
Inspiration Copper Company smelter at Miami, Arizona, c. 1915

On February 23, 1883, United Verde Copper Company was incorporated under New York law. The small mining camp next to the mine was given a proper name, 'Jerome.' The town was named after the family which had invested a large amount of capital. In 1885 Lewis Williams opened a copper smelter in Bisbee and the copper boom began, as the nation turned to copper wires for electricity. The arrival of railroads in the 1880s made mining even more profitable, and national corporations bought control of the mines and invested in new equipment. Mining operations flourished in numerous boom towns, such as Bisbee, Jerome, Douglas, Ajo and Miami.

=== Wild West ===
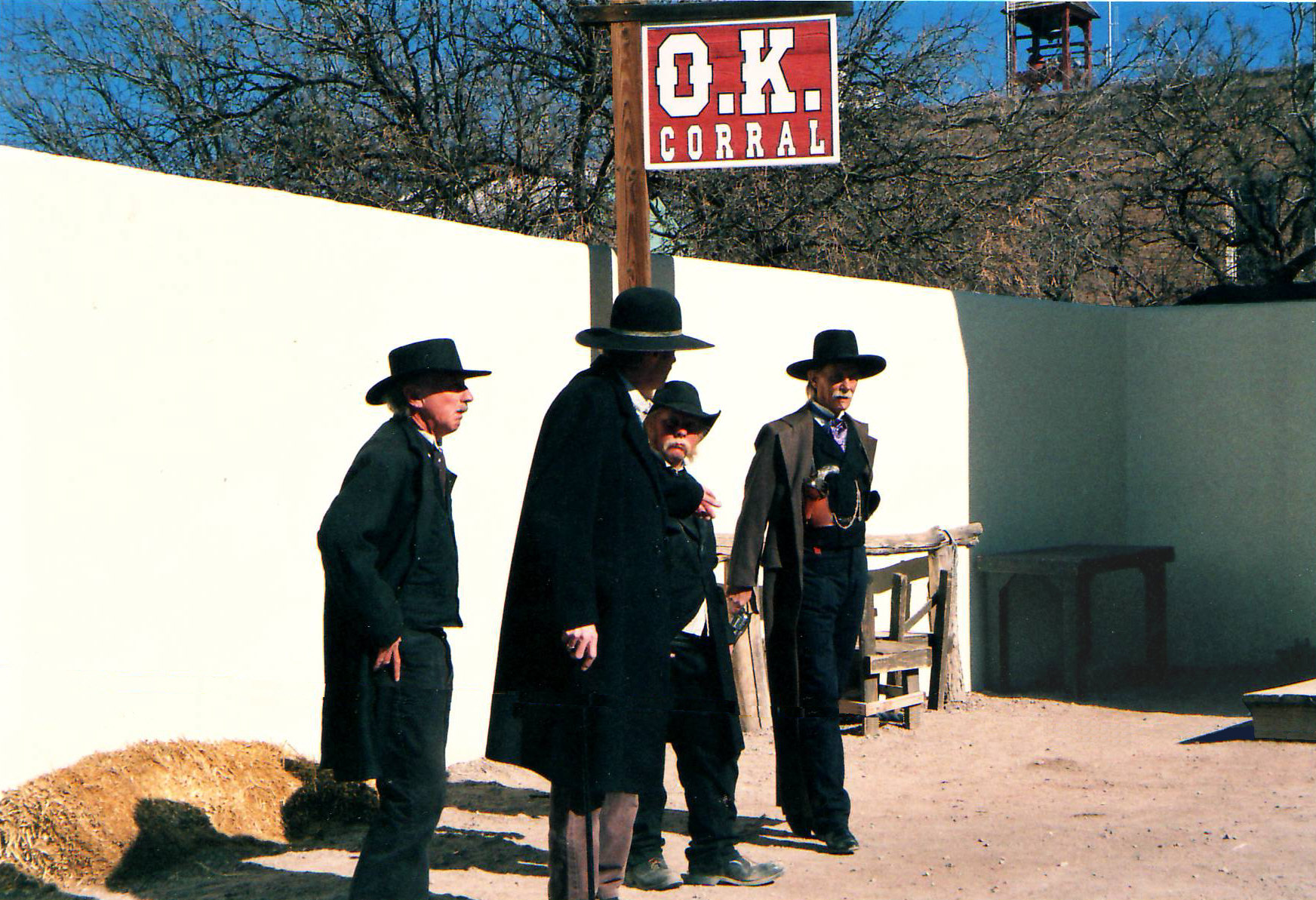
Hourly re-enactment for tourists of the Gunfight at the O.K. Corral

Arizona's "wild west" reputation can be considered well deserved. Tombstone was a notorious mining town that flourished longer than most, from 1877 to 1929. Silver was discovered in 1877, and by 1881 the town had a population of over 10,000. Western story tellers and Hollywood film makers made as much money in Tombstone as anyone, thanks to the arrival of Wyatt Earp and his brothers in 1879. They bought shares in the Vizina mine, water rights, and gambling concessions, but Virgil, Morgan and Wyatt were soon appointed as federal and local marshals. They killed three outlaws in the Gunfight at the O.K. Corral, the most famous gunfight of the Old West.

In the aftermath, Virgil Earp was maimed in an ambush and Morgan Earp was assassinated while playing billiards. Walter Noble Burns's novel Tombstone (1927) made Earp famous. Hollywood celebrated Earp's Tombstone days with John Ford's My Darling Clementine (1946), John Sturges's Gunfight at the O.K. Corral (1957) and Hour of the Gun (1967), Frank Perry's Doc (1971), George Cosmatos's Tombstone (1993), and Lawrence Kasdan's Wyatt Earp (1994). They solidified Earp's modern reputation as the Old West's deadliest gunman.

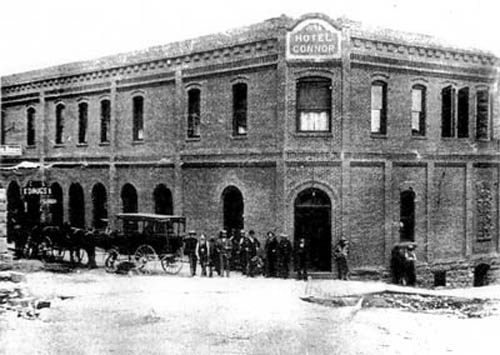
Connor Hotel in Jerome

Jennie Bauters (1862–1905) operated brothels in the Territory from 1896 to 1905. She was an astute businesswoman with an eye for real estate appreciation, and a way with the town fathers of Jerome regarding taxes and restrictive ordinances. She was not always sitting pretty; her brothels were burned in a series of major fires that swept the business district; her girls were often drug addicts. As respectability closed in on her, in 1903 she relocated to the mining camp of Acme. In 1905, she was murdered by a man who had posed as her husband.

== Early 20th century ==
=== Tourism ===
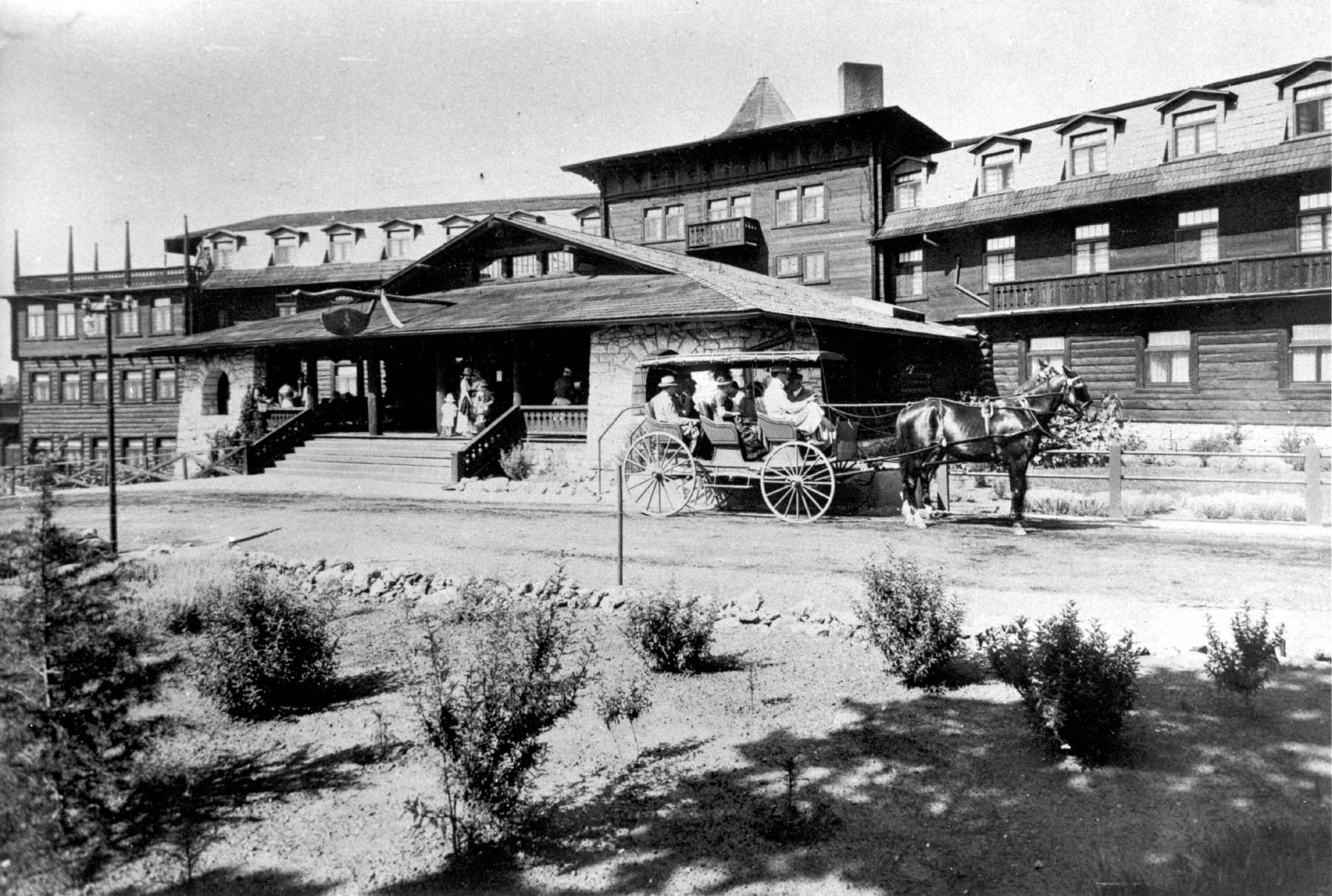
The luxury Harvey House hotel opened in 1905 overlooking the South Rim of the Grand Canyon; it remains in operation as the El Tovar Hotel.

By 1869 Americans were reading John Wesley Powell's reports of his explorations of the Colorado River. In 1901, the Santa Fe Railroad reached Grand Canyon's South Rim. With railroad, restaurant and hotel entrepreneur Fred Harvey leading the way, large-scale tourism began that has never abated. The Grand Canyon has become an iconic symbol of the West and the nation as a whole.

=== Chinese ===
The Chinese came to Arizona with the construction of the Southern Pacific Railroad in 1880. Tucson was the main railroad center and soon had a Chinatown with laundries for the general population and a rich mix of restaurants, groceries, and services for the residents. Chinese and Mexican merchants and farmers transcended racial differences to form 'guanxi,' which were relations of friendship and trust. Chinese leased land from Mexicans, operated grocery stores, and aided compatriots attempting to enter the United States from Mexico after the Mexican Revolution in 1910. Chinese merchants helped supply General John Pershing's army in its expedition against Pancho Villa. Successful Chinese in Tucson led a viable community based on social integration, friendship, and kinship.

=== Statehood ===
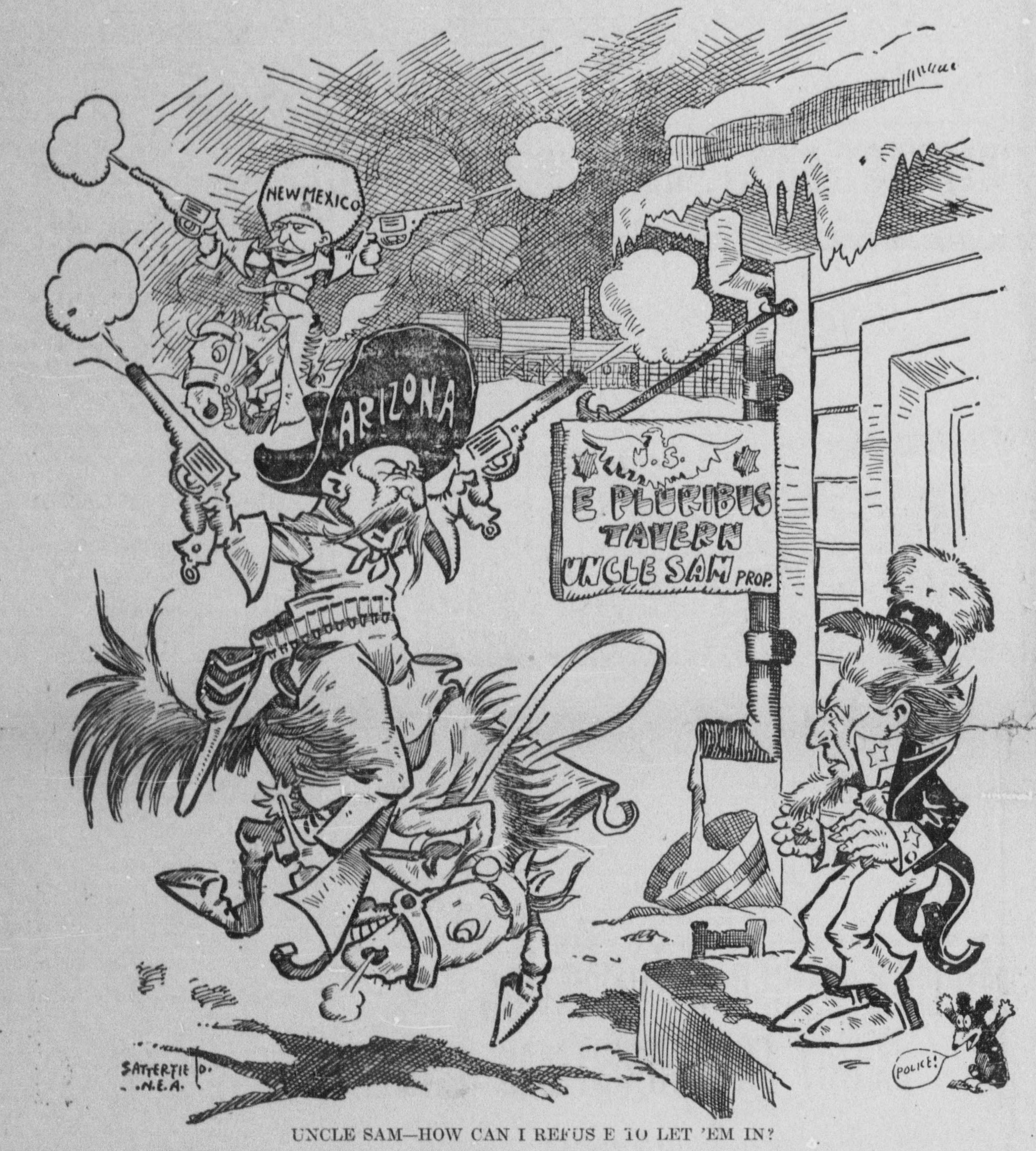
1903 editorial cartoon by Bob Satterfield, depicting Arizona and New Mexico as crazed gunfighters intent on gaining access to the "E pluribus unum tavern".

In February 1903, U.S. Senator Hamilton Kean spoke against Arizona's statehood. He said Mormons who fled from Idaho to Mexico would return to the U.S. and mix in the politics of Arizona.

In 1912, Arizona almost entered the Union as part of New Mexico in a Republican plan to keep control of the U.S. Senate. The plan, while accepted by most in New Mexico, was rejected by most Arizonans. Progressives in Arizona favored inclusion in the state constitution of the initiative, referendum, recall, direct election of senators, woman suffrage, and other reforms. Most of these proposals were included in the constitution that was rejected by Congress.

A new constitution was offered with the problematic provisions removed. Congress then voted to approve statehood, and President Taft signed the statehood bill on February 14, 1912. State residents promptly put the provisions back in. Hispanics had little voice or power. Only one of the 53 delegates at the constitutional convention was Hispanic, and he refused to sign. In 1912 women gained suffrage in the state, eight years before the country as a whole.

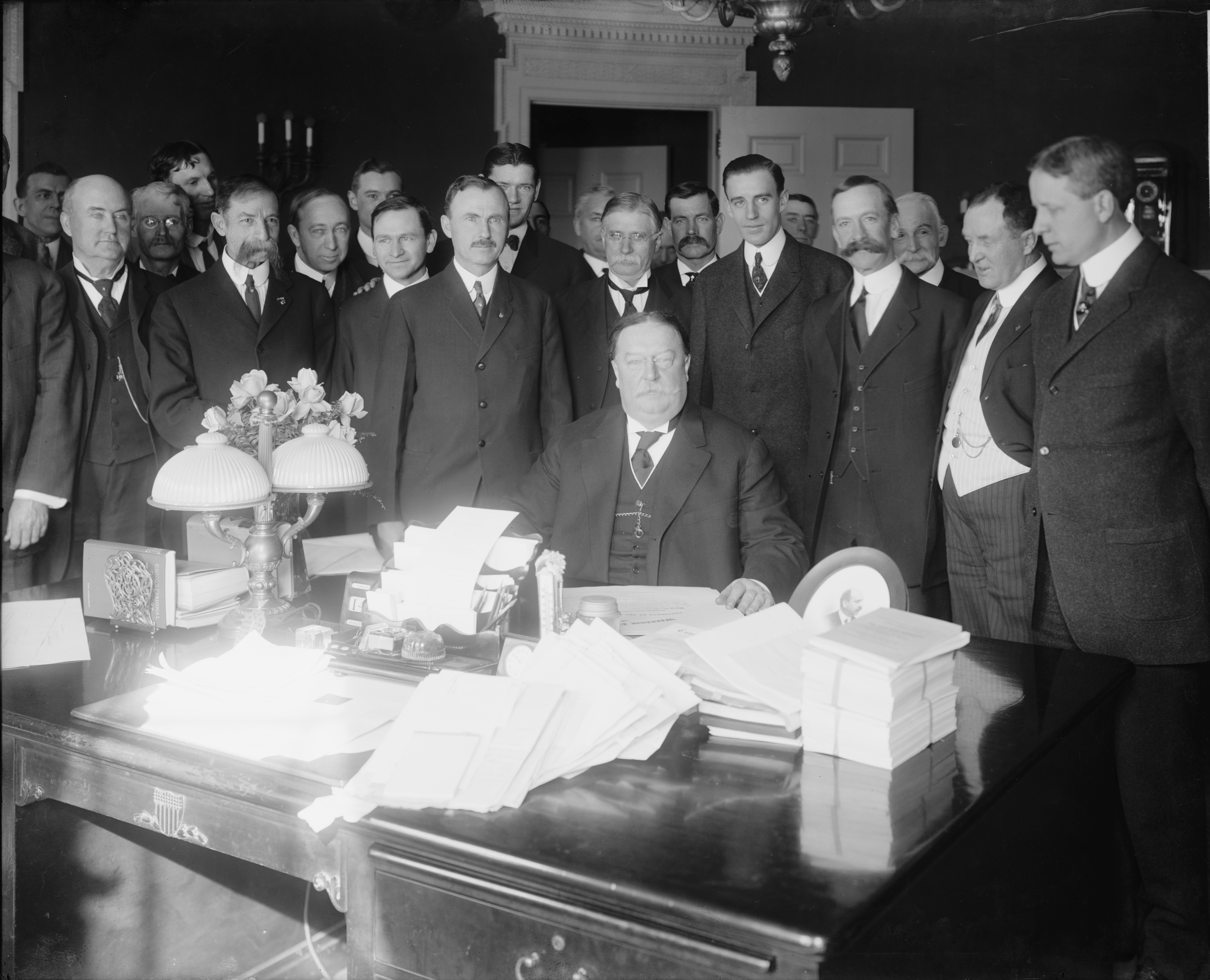
Signing of Arizona statehood bill in 1912

Arizona's first Congressman was Carl Hayden (1877–1972). He was the son of a Yankee merchant who had moved to Tempe because he needed dry heat for his bad lungs. Carl attended Stanford University and moved up the political ladder as town councilman, county treasurer, and Maricopa County sheriff, where he nabbed Arizona's last train robbers. He also started building a coalition to develop the state's water resources, a lifelong interest. A liberal Democrat his entire career, Hayden was elected to Congress in 1912 and moved to the Senate in 1926.

Reelection followed every six years as he advanced toward the chairmanship of the powerful Appropriations Committee, which he reached in 1955. His only difficult campaign came in 1962, at age 85, when he defeated a young conservative. He retired in 1968 after a record 56 years in Congress. His great achievement was his 41-year battle to enact the Central Arizona Project that would provide water for future growth.

=== The Great Depression ===
The Great Depression of 1929–39 hit Arizona hard. At first local, state and private relief efforts focused on charity, especially by the Community Chest and Organized Charities programs. Federal money started arriving with the Federal Emergency Relief Committee in 1930. Different agencies promoted aid to the unemployed, tuberculosis patients, transients, and illegal immigrants. The money ran out by 1931 or 1932, and conditions were bad until New Deal relief operations began on a large scale in 1933.

Construction programs were important, especially the Hoover Dam (originally called Boulder Dam), begun by President Herbert Hoover. It is a concrete arch-gravity dam in the Black Canyon of the Colorado River, on the border with Nevada. It was constructed by the Federal Bureau of Reclamation between 1931 and 1936. It operationalized a schedule of water use set by the Colorado River Compact of 1922 that gave Arizona 19% of the river's water, with 25% to Nevada and the rest to California.

=== World War II ===
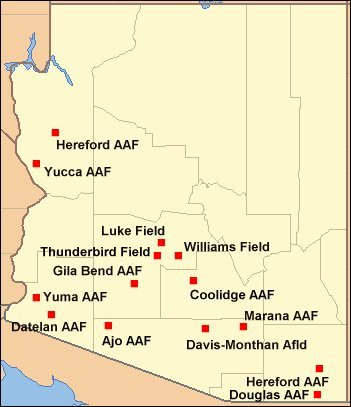
Major airfields in Arizona during World War II.

Construction of military bases in Arizona was a national priority because of the state's excellent flying weather and clear skies, large amounts of unoccupied land, good railroads, cheap labor, low taxes, and its proximity to California's aviation industry. Arizona was attractive to both the military and private firms and they stayed after the war.

Fort Huachuca became one of the largest nearly-all-black Army forts, with quarters for 1,300 officers and 24,000 enlisted soldiers. The 92nd and 93rd Infantry Divisions, composed of African-American troops, trained there.

During the war, Mexican-American community organizations were very active in patriotic efforts to support American troops abroad, and made efforts to support the war effort materially and to provide moral support for the American servicemen fighting the war, especially the Mexican-American servicemen from local communities. Some of the community projects were cooperative ventures in which members of both the Mexican-American and Anglo communities participated. Most efforts made in the Mexican-American community represented localized American home front activities that were separate from the activities of the Anglo community.

Mexican-American women organized to assist their servicemen and the war effort. An underlying goal of the Spanish-American Mothers and Wives Association was the reinforcement of the woman's role in Spanish-Mexican culture. The organization raised thousands of dollars, wrote letters, and joined in numerous celebrations of their culture and their support for Mexican-American servicemen. Membership reached over 300 during the war and eventually ended its existence in 1976.

Heavy government spending during World War II revitalized the Arizona economy, which was still based on copper mining, citrus and cotton crops and cattle ranching, with a growing tourist business.

Military installations peppered the state, such as Davis-Monthan Field in Tucson, the main training center for air force bomber pilots. Two relocation camps opened for Japanese and Japanese Americans brought in from the West Coast.

== After 1945 ==
After World War II the population grew rapidly, increasing sevenfold between 1950 and 2000, from 700,000 to over 5 million. Most of the growth was in the Phoenix area, with Tucson a distant second. Urban growth doomed the state's citrus industry, as the groves were turned into housing developments.

The cost of water made growing cotton less profitable, and Arizona's production steadily declined. Manufacturing employment jumped from 49,000 in 1960 to 183,000 by 1985, with half the workers in well-paid positions. High-tech firms such as Motorola, Hughes Aircraft, Goodyear Aircraft, Honeywell, and IBM had offices in the Phoenix area. By 1959, Hughes Aircraft had built advanced missiles with 5,000 workers in Tucson.

=== Political leadership ===
Despite being a small state, Arizona produced several national leaders for both the Republican and Democratic parties. Two Republican Senators were presidential nominees: Barry Goldwater in 1964 and John McCain in 2008; both carried Arizona but lost the national election. Senator Ernest McFarland, a Democrat, was the Majority Leader of the U.S. Senate from 1951 to 1952, and Congressman John Rhodes was the Republican Minority Leader in the House from 1973 to 1981. Democrats Bruce Babbitt (Governor 1978–87) and Morris Udall (Congressman 1961–90) were contenders for their party's presidential nominations. In 1981 Sandra Day O'Connor became the first woman on the U.S. Supreme Court; she served until 2006.

=== Retirement communities ===
Warm winters and low cost of living attracted retirees from the so-called snowbelt, who moved permanently to Arizona after 1945, bringing their pensions, Social Security, and savings with them. Real estate entrepreneurs catered to them with new communities with amenities pitched to older people, and with few facilities for children. Typically they were gated communities with controlled access and had pools, recreation centers, and golf courses.

In 1954, two developers bought 320 acres (1.3 km2) of farmland near Phoenix and opened the nation's first planned community dedicated exclusively to retirees at Youngtown. In 1960, developer Del Webb, inspired by the amenities in Florida's trailer parks, added facilities for "active adults" in his new Sun City planned community near Phoenix. In 1962 Ross Cortese opened the first of his gated Leisure Worlds. Other developers copied the popular model, and by 2000 18% of the retirees in the state lived in such "lifestyle" communities.

=== Environmental issues ===
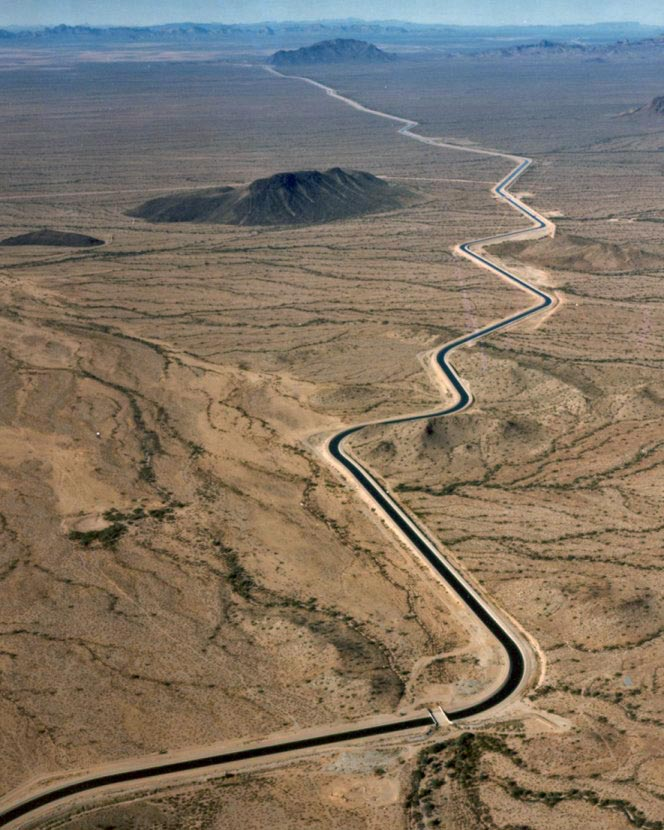
Water delivered by the Central Arizona Project's canal.

The issues of the fragile natural environment, compounded by questions of water shortage and distribution, led to numerous debates. The debate crossed traditional lines, so that the leading conservative, Senator Barry Goldwater, was also keenly concerned. For example, Goldwater supported the controversial Colorado River Storage Project (CRSP). He wrote:

I feel very definitely that the [Nixon] administration is absolutely correct in cracking down on companies and corporations and municipalities that continue to pollute the nation's air and water. While I am a great believer in the free competitive enterprise system and all that it entails, I am an even stronger believer in the right of our people to live in a clean and pollution-free environment. To this end, it is my belief that when pollution is found, it should be halted at the source, even if this requires stringent government action against important segments of our national economy.

Water issues were central. Agriculture consumed 89% of the state's strictly limited water supply while generating only 3% of the state's income. The Groundwater Management Act of 1980, sponsored by Governor Bruce Babbitt, raised the price of water to farmers, while cities had to reach a "safe yield" so that the groundwater usage did not exceed natural replenishment. New housing developments had to prove they had enough water for the next hundred years. Desert foliage suitable for a dry region soon replaced grass.

Cotton acreage declined dramatically, freeing up land for suburban sprawl as well as releasing large amounts of water and ending the need for expensive specialized machinery. Cotton acreage plunged from 120,000 acres in 1997 to only 40,000 acres in 2005, even as the federal treasury gave the state's farmers over $678 million in cotton subsidies. Many farmers collect the subsidies but no longer grow cotton. About 80% of the state's cotton is exported to textile factories in China and (since the passage of NAFTA) to Mexico.

== Recent events ==
Super Bowl XXX was played in Tempe in 1996 and Super Bowl XLII was held in Glendale in 2008. Super Bowl XLIX was also held in Glendale in 2015. Super Bowl LVII was played in Glendale, Arizona in 2023.

By the 1990s many families were moving to the Phoenix and Tucson areas from California, where housing was much more expensive.

Illegal immigration from Mexico continued to be a prime concern within the state, and in April 2010, Arizona SB1070 was passed and signed into law by Governor Jan Brewer. The measure attracted national attention as the most thorough anti-illegal immigration measure in decades within the United States.

Congresswoman Gabrielle Giffords was shot in the head during a political event in Tucson on January 8, 2011. The shooting resulted in six deaths and several injuries. Giffords was badly injured and left Congress, becoming an advocate for gun control.

On June 30, 2013, nineteen members of the Prescott Fire Department were killed fighting the Yarnell Hill Fire. The fatalities were members of the Granite Mountain Hotshots, a hotshot crew, of whom only one survived as he was working in another location.

Border crisis: by 2019 Arizona was one of the states most affected by the border crisis, with a high number of migrant crossings and detentions.

The COVID-19 pandemic in Arizona (2020–2021) saw Arizona as one of the worst-hit states, with high infection and death rates. As of June 3, 2021 the cumulative totals were 882,691 cases and 17,653 deaths. One in 8 residents has been positively diagnosed with COVID-19.

In the two-month period after Governor of Arizona Doug Ducey abruptly ended Arizona's statewide lockdown on May 15, 2020, the seven-day moving average of new COVID-19 cases in Arizona soared, from an average of 377 cases per day to 3,249 cases on July 15. On July 8, Arizona reported as many new cases of COVID-19 as the entire European Union, while having 1/60th of the population. On June 17, Governor Ducey, under pressure due to rising COVID cases, publicly encouraged Arizona citizens to wear masks and allowed individual cities and counties to issue mask mandates. No statewide mandate was issued, but most major cities and counties in AZ issued local mandates. COVID-19 cases and deaths continued to rise through July, with 172 deaths reported on July 30, 2020.

After four months during which the day over day increase in new COVID-19 cases never dropped below 1%, in August the case rate dropped dramatically, to less than 900 new cases per day. A generally low new case rate continued in Arizona through October 2020 but in November a second major COVID-19 surge began, reaching new records in early January 2021. January 3's 17,236 new cases and January 12's 335 deaths both set new single day records in Arizona. The COVID-19 pandemic in the Navajo Nation has been particularly serious because of poor health, food and limited access to essential services.

As of March 10, 2023, Arizona has administered 14,526,275 COVID-19 vaccine doses. Arizona has fully vaccinated 4,809,730 people, equivalent to 65% percent of the population.

== See also ==
- Government of Arizona
- Index of Arizona-related articles
- Indigenous peoples of the North American Southwest
- Timeline of Arizona history
- List of cities and towns in Arizona
  - History of Flagstaff, Arizona
  - Timeline of Mesa, Arizona
  - History of Phoenix, Arizona
    - Timeline of Phoenix, Arizona
    - List of people from Phoenix
  - History of Tucson, Arizona
    - Timeline of Tucson, Arizona
- List of counties in Arizona
- List of ghost towns in Arizona
- List of governors of Arizona
- Outline of Arizona
- Women's suffrage in Arizona
- Territorial evolution of Arizona
  - Territory of Arizona
  - State of Arizona
- Timeline of Arizona

== Bibliography ==
=== Surveys ===
- Cheek, Lawrence W. (1995). Arizona. (Oakland, CA: Compass American Guides). ISBN 1878867725
- Johnson, G. Wesley Jr., ed. (1993). Phoenix in the Twentieth Century: Essays in Community History. Univ. of Oklahoma Press. ISBN 0806124687.
- Johnson, G. Wesley Jr. Phoenix, Valley of the Sun (1982), popular
- Luckingham, Bradford. Phoenix: The History of a Southwestern Metropolis (1989) online
- Lucy, Beth and Noel J. Stowe, eds. Arizona at Seventy-Five: The Next Twenty-Five Years (Arizona Historical Society, 1987)
- Melton, Brad, and Dean Smith, eds. Arizona Goes to War: The Home Front and the Front Lines during World War II (U. of Arizona Press, 2003)
- Sheridan, Thomas E. Arizona: A History (2012), a major scholarly history with a very comprehensive bibliography.
- VanderMeer, Philip. Desert Visions and the Making of Phoenix, 1860–2009 (2010) ISBN 978-0826348913, scholarly
- VanderMeer, Philip. Phoenix Rising: The Making of a Desert Metropolis (2002), popular
- Wagoner, Jay J. Arizona Territory 1863–1912: A Political history (U. of Arizona Press, 1970).

=== Economy and environment ===
- August, Jack L., and Grady Gammage. "Shaped by water: An Arizona historical perspective." in Arizona Water Policy (Routledge, 2010) pp. 10–25.
- Grimm, Nancy B., and Charles L. Redman. "Approaches to the study of urban ecosystems: The case of Central Arizona—Phoenix." Urban ecosystems 7 (2004): 199–213. online
- Haskett, Bert. "The Early History of the Cattle Industry in Arizona," Arizona Historical Review (October 1935), 6#1 pp. 3–42
- Haskett, Bert. "History of the Sheep Industry in Arizona," Arizona Historical Review (July 1936) 7#1 pp. 3–49.
- Hutchins, Terry. Arizona roadside discoveries : a guidebook to the natural and human history of Arizona's roadways (2002) online
- Klein, Kerwin Lee. "The last resort: Tourism, growth, and values in twentieth-century Arizona" (PhD dissertation, The University of Arizona; ProQuest Dissertations & Theses, 1990. 1341830).
- Kupel, Douglas E. Fuel for Growth: Water and Arizona's Urban Environment (2008) online
- Larson, Kelli L., Annie Gustafson, and Paul Hirt. "Insatiable thirst and a finite supply: an assessment of municipal water-conservation policy in greater Phoenix, Arizona, 1980–2007." Journal of Policy History 21.2 (2009): 107–137. online
- Logan, Michael F. (2006). Desert Cities: The Environmental History of Phoenix and Tucson. U. of Pittsburgh Press. ISBN 978-0822942948.
- Redman, Charles L., and Ann P. Kinzig. "Water can flow uphill: A narrative of central Arizona." in Agricultural landscapes in transition: comparisons of long-term ecological and cultural change (Oxford University Press, 2008) pp: 238–271. online
- Smith, Karen Lynn. The Magnificent Experiment: Building the Salt River Reclamation Project, 1890–1917 (U. of Arizona Press, 1986).
- Sowards Adam M. "Reclamation, Ranching, and Reservation: Environmental, Cultural, and Governmental Rivalries in Transitional Arizona," Journal of the Southwest (1998) 40#3 pp. 333+
- Stauder, Jack. The Blue and the Green: a cultural ecological history of an Arizona ranching community (2016) online
- Walker, Henry Pickering; Bufkin, Don (1986). Historical Atlas of Arizona (2nd ed.). Norman: University of Oklahoma Press.
- Webb, Robert H., et al. Requiem for the Santa Cruz: an environmental history of an Arizona river (University of Arizona Press, 2014) online.
- Wilson, James A. "The Arizona Cattle Industry: Its Political and Public Image 1950–1963." Arizona and the West (1966): 339–348.
- Zuniga-Teran, A., and C. Staddon. "Tucson Arizona–a story of “water resilience” through diversifying water sources, demand management, and ecosystem restoration." in Resilient water services and systems (2019): 193.

=== Politics ===
- August, Jack L., Jr. Vision in the Desert: Carl Hayden and Hydropolitics in the American Southwest, (Texas Christian University Press, 1999)
- Berman, David R. Politics, Labor, and the War on Big Business: The Path of Reform in Arizona, 1890–1920 (Boulder: University Press of Colorado, 2012) 330 pp
- Berman, David R. George Hunt: Arizona's Crusading Seven-Term Governor (University of Arizona Press, 2015) 251 pp.
- Goldberg, Robert Alan. Barry Goldwater (1995)
- Johnson, James W. Arizona Politicians: The Noble and the Notorious (University of Arizona Press, 2002)
- Myers, John L., ed. The Arizona Governors, 1912–1990 (Heritage Pubs, 1989)
- Rice, Ross R. Carl Hayden: Builder of the American West (1994)
- Rice, Ross R. "The 1958 Election in Arizona," Western Political Quarterly (1959) 12#1 Part 2 pp. 266–275 in JSTOR; every two years the journal publishes an article on Arizona elections
- Shermer, Elizabeth Tandy. Sunbelt Capitalism: Phoenix and the Transformation of American Politics (University of Pennsylvania Press, 2013) excerpt
- Timberg, Robert. John McCain: An American Odyssey (2007)
- Wagoner, Jay J. Arizona Territory, 1863–1912: A Political History (1970)

=== Ethnicity and race ===
- Benton-Cohen, Katherine. Borderline Americans: Racial Division and Labor War in the Arizona Borderlands (2009), on Hispanics
- Del Castillo, Richard Griswold. La Familia: Chicano Families in the Urban Southwest, 1848 to the Present (University of Notre Dame Press, 1991). online
- Dobyns, Henry F. Spanish colonial Tucson: A demographic history (University of Arizona Press, 2019).
- Fong, Lawrence Michael. "Sojourners and Settlers: The Chinese Experience in Arizona," Journal of Arizona History (Autumn 1980) 21#1 pp. 1–30.
- Goodman, James M. The Navajo Atlas: Environments, Resources, People and History of the Diné Bikeyah (1987)
- Luckingham, Bradford, ed. Minorities in Phoenix: A Profile of Mexican American, Chinese American, and African American Communities, 1860–1992 (U. of Arizona Press, 1994) online
- Meeks, Eric V. Border Citizens: The Making of Indians, Mexicans, and Anglos in Arizona (2007)
- Officer, James E. Hispanic Arizona, 1536–1856 (U. of Arizona Press, 1987)
- Sheridan, Thomas E. Los Tucsonenses: The Mexican Community in Tucson, 1854–1941 (U. of Arizona Press, 1986)
- Sheridan, Thomas E. "The limits of power: the political ecology of the Spanish Empire in the Greater Southwest." Antiquity 66.250 (1992): 153–171. online

=== 19th century studies ===
- Bancroft, Hubert Howe (1889). The Works of Hubert Howe Bancroft: History of Arizona and New Mexico. History Co.; online free
- De Long; Sidney Randolph (1905). The history of Arizona: from the earliest times known to the people of Europe to 1903. Whitaker & Ray.
- Farish, Thomas Edwin (1918). History of Arizona. Filmer Brothers. vol 5 (early 20th century) online free
- Hinton, Richard Josiah (1878). The Hand-book to Arizona: its resources, history, towns, mines, ruins and scenery ... Payot, Upham & Co. ISBN 978-0598277268.
