= Archaic–Early Basketmaker period =

Ancient culture of the southwest United States

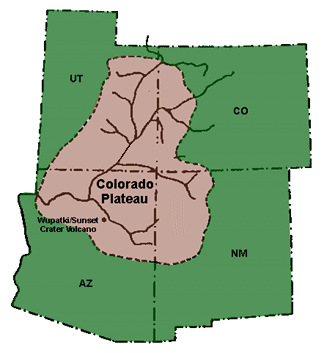
Colorado Plateau

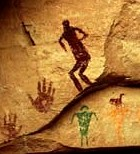
Pictograph, southeastern Utah, c. 1200 BCE Basketmaker culture

The Archaic–Early Basketmaker period (7000–1500 BCE) was an Archaic cultural period of ancestors to the Ancestral Puebloans of Oasisamerica. They were distinguished from other Archaic people of the Southwest by their basketry, which was used to gather and store food. They became reliant on wild seeds, grasses, nuts, and fruit for food, and adapted their movement patterns and lifestyle by maximizing the edible wild food and small game available within a geographical region. Manos and metates began to be used to process seeds and nuts. With the extinction of megafauna, hunters adapted their tools, using spears with smaller projectile points and then atlatl and darts. Simple dwellings made of wood, brush and earth provided shelter.

The Archaic–Early Basketmaker period is followed by the Early Basketmaker II period.

== Hunter-gatherer culture ==
Holocene climate changes (beginning about 10,000 BCE) resulted in warmer and drier weather, a contributing factor in the extinction of megafauna, such as the mastodon and mammoth that were hunted by the preceding Paleo-Indians. Besides climate change, the large animals may have perished due to increased human population and their improved hunting techniques. By 6000 BCE two-thirds of all North American animals weighing more than 100 pounds were extinct and the bison antiquus was the only large animal to survive on the Great Plains.

About 5000 BCE Holocene glacial runoff affected Colorado Plateau storm patterns which resulted in significant soil erosion. Between 2500 and 2000 BCE there was significant soil build up. When the climate became too arid to produce sufficient food, people relocated until the rate of precipitation increased. Over time there was an increase in drought-resistant plants and the plants that required regular watering did not survive. Woodlands of spruce and fir were replaced by juniper and pinyon trees in the northern Rio Grande valley. Further south, there were fewer juniper and pinyon trees. Both climatic changes resulted in human movement pattern changes to obtain food.

The Paleo-Indian had a straightforward movement pattern: follow and hunt the big animals. The Archaic individuals followed a new pattern called "making the seasonal rounds" where they moved to familiar places based upon the growing seasons of plants, their major source of food. In the spring, summer and early fall women harvested seeds, nuts, fruit, grasses, juniper berries and mesquite beans. Any surplus food was stored for later use. Men hunted small game like rabbits using traps and snares. During the fall and winter men hunted deer, big horn sheep, bison and antelope with the atlatl and darts.

Wild foods
Amaranth	Goosefoot	Pinyon nuts	Ricegrass	Yucca
Seeds and grass	Seeds and greens	Nuts	Seeds	Fruit

Although the number of people increased during the Archaic period, they traveled in small groups throughout the arid lowlands of juniper and sage to the moister climate of the pinyon forest about 6,000 feet (1,800 m) in elevation. Different sets of projectile points were found within a regional geographic area, made from local stone, an indication that Archaic people ranged across shorter expanses of land. Since they more fully utilized diverse plant and game resources within a region, they didn't need to travel as far to find food. The different shaped tools may have been used for people to identify themselves. The bands of people likely socialized with neighboring tribes, rather than people from distant lands.

Based upon the introduction of cultivation, new dwelling types and artifacts, it is believed that people from southern Arizona and New Mexico moved north and integrated with bands of people in the Colorado Plateau. By the end of the period, some people cultivated food and became less mobile, but agriculture would not be consistently adopted until the 1st century CE in the Early Basketmaker II period.

Excavation of their campsites and rock shelters revealed that the Archaic-Early Basketmaker people made baskets, tools, gathered wild plants, and killed and processed game. Slab-lined storage cists, found both inside and outside of shelters, were used to store food which indicates a change from a totally nomadic lifestyle.

== Basketmaker origin ==
The population of the Basketmaker people is likely not tied to one particular group of people, but reflective of the migration of agricultural people from the south and adoption of agriculture by local Archaic populations. For instance, people on the Mogollon Rim of New Mexico had cultivated maize and adopted a less transitory lifestyle before the Early Basketmaker people.

Projectile points, a basketry style known as "two rod and bundle", and other similarities existed between artifacts of the Early and Late Basketmaker II periods and the San Pedro stage of the Cochise tradition.

To adopt the Basketmaker lifestyle, Archaic people would have adopted the cultivation of maize, a less mobile lifestyle and taken up residence in pit-houses. Other differences between the Archaic and Basketmaker cultures were the forms of basketry, symbols used in petroglyphs, burial practices and volume of traded items.

Anthropologist Cynthia Irwin-Williams contends that the Ancestral Puebloans, and hence the Basketmaker culture, developed, at least in part, from the contemporaneous Oshara tradition (ca. 5440 BCE — 460 CE) of the southwest United States, with whom they shared some similarities, such as use of manos and metates, a preference for dwelling on mesas and at canyon heads, and the cultivation of corn.

== Shelters ==
Since the people of the Archaic–Early Basketmaker period were nomadic hunter gatherers who roamed the Colorado Plateau to hunt game or gather seasonal wild plants, their homes were easily built. The bands of people generally inhabited rock alcoves or lived out in the open in brush shelters and lean-tos. The dwellings were made by digging a shallow basin and building a frame of wooden logs in the shape of a cone, dome or tent. The frames were covered with brush and earthen daub that acted as a sealant for protection against the elements. Rocks may have been placed around the base of the shelter or lean-to and fire pits were sometimes used inside the homes. The shallow-basined lodgings are considered a precursor to the Basketmaker pit-houses.

In the summer, campsites were made at high elevations: on the top of mesas or ridges. They also had temporary campsites in the mountains, low mesas and ponds formed by spring runoff. Structures, built in the later part of this period, were built at lower elevations.

== Material goods ==
Items found at the Archaic-Early Basketmaker sites include:

- Stone scrapers, lithic scatters (tool-making debris), projectile points, knives, milling tools and debris.
- Crude manos and metates to grind wild nuts and seeds
- Spears, atlatls and darts
- Snares
- Baskets
- Rope and sandals
- Clothing made of hides
- Animal (bighorn sheep, elk, deer) figurines made of twigs
- Bone and wooden artifacts.

== Archaic–Early Basketmaker sites ==
- Chaco Canyon in northwest New Mexico has more than 70 campsites, spanning the period from 7000 to 1500 BCE. One site is Atlatl Cave.
- Lukachukai and Salina Springs in the Chinle Valley of northeastern Arizona are late Archaic–Early Basketmaker sites.
- The Cove–Red valley area in New Mexico
- The LaPlata valley of northwestern New Mexico and southwestern Colorado; For Colorado sites, see Colorado LaPlata sites.
- A domed Archaic shelter was found near Mesa Verde, Colorado.
- Dust Devil cave, dated about 6000 BCE, is located on Navajo Mountain in Arizona.
- There were five Archaic–Early Basketmaker sites found in the Pecos River valley that were likely for hunting deer and gathering wild plants. Eight additional hunting sites are located in the nearby mountains, devoid of wild plant gathering evidence. Three pit houses were found from the latter years of the period. Sporadic sightings of projectile points and other artifacts were also found.
- Tohatchi Flats in New Mexico
- Ute Mountain sites are classified by Hurley as late Archaic–Early Basketmaker, but the time period is from 500 BCE – 100 CE, perhaps more indicative of the degree of technology and culture capabilities than the time period.

Sites that may represent a transition to Basketmaker traditions:

- Upper Gunnison River basin: about 8,000 to 3,000 years before present (roughly 6000 to 1000 BCE), inhabitants lived in dwellings and had storage systems similar to those of the Basketmaker II and San Pedro phase of the Cochise tradition.
- Yarmony House: two pit houses dated about 6140 to 6410 years before present (about 4000 BCE) appear similar to Basketmaker pit houses. One of the dwellings, set within a shallow basin, was 19.7 feet (6.0 m) in diameter with an 11 feet (3.4 m) antechamber, or front room. Within the home were a fire pit, slab-lined storage cists, animal bones, and metates and manos to grind wild food. The number of elk, deer, rabbit and other animal bones, and evidence that they were processed to extract bone marrow and grease, suggests that the site was used during the winter season or another period when food was scarce. The site is located in Eagle County, Colorado.
