= Picosa culture =

Archaeological culture

- Geographical range: California, Arizona, Utah, New Mexico, Colorado
- Period: Archaic
- Preceded by: Paleo-Indian
- Followed by: Oshara tradition

The Picosa culture encapsulates the Archaic lifestyles of people from three locations with interconnected artifacts and lifestyles. It was named by Cynthia Irwin-Williams in the 1960s for those areas: Pinto Basin (PI), Cochise tradition (CO) and San Pedro (SA), which all together is "Picosa".

The people in the dispersed locations in the American Southwest lived in similar housing, used similar burial practices and had similar lifestyles. The artifacts from the sites demonstrate similarity in the technology used and personal material goods. The Picosa culture has been found in the states of California, Arizona, Utah, New Mexico and Colorado. It was the predecessor to the Oshara tradition.

== See also ==
- Outline of Colorado prehistory
- Prehistory of Colorado
