= Hannah Marie Wormington =

American archaeologist (1914–1994)

- Born: September 5, 1914
- Died: May 31, 1994 (aged 79)
- Education: Ph.D. in anthropology, 1954
- Occupation: North American Archaeologist
- Employer(s): Denver Museum of Nature and Science
- Awards: Colorado Women's Hall of Fame, 1985

Hannah Marie Wormington (September 5, 1914 – May 31, 1994) was an American archaeologist known for her writings and fieldwork on southwestern and Paleo-Indians archaeology over a long career that lasted almost sixty years.

== Background ==
Marie Wormington was born in Denver, Colorado, to Charles Watkin Wormington and Adrienne Roucolle. As a young child Wormington spent much of her time with her mother and her maternal grandmother who had come to the United States from France. Being fluent in both English and French proved to be a useful asset the summer she went to France to start her archaeology career. Wormington was the first woman to focus on anthropology at Radcliffe. While taking classes at Harvard for her Ph.D. she had a professor who requested that she (because she was a woman) sit outside the classroom to take notes. Before obtaining her Ph.D., Wormington already had an accomplished career in anthropology, which began in 1935 after she graduated with her B.A. in Anthropology from the University of Denver. Her initial areas of interest were medicine and zoology, but changed to archaeology after taking a few classes taught by E. B. Renaud, whose focus was on the French Paleolithic. He supported the idea of Paleolithic stone tool technologies in the New World that were identical to other parts of the world. Renaud suggested to Wormington traveling to France to do research. Beyond her professional and academic career, Wormington was married to geologist Peter Volk from 1940 until his death in 1980.

== Education ==
Wormington graduated high school in 1931 from East High School in Denver. Wormington earned a B.A. of Anthropology at University of Denver in 1935, a M.A. of Anthropology at Radcliffe College in 1950, and a Ph.D. of Anthropology at Radcliffe (Harvard University) in 1954.

== Early career ==
Wormington jump-started her career through the connections she made by contacting Dorothy Garrod when she was in London. She traveled to Europe with her mother in 1935, after presenting a proposal to the Museum that she would photograph and document Folsom artifacts in the Museum's collection and present them to European museums. Garrod became a mentor to Wormington, and she put her in touch with some notable archaeologists working in Paris at the time, including Harper Pat Kelley and Henri Martin. While working alongside Kelley, Wormington was allowed to borrow artifacts found in Europe for data collection at the Denver Museum. Martin insisted that Wormington be a part of the Paleolithic excavations taking place at Dordogne, and Wormington spent her 21st birthday doing just that.

After returning home to her native Denver, Wormington was hired on at the Colorado Museum of Natural History (later renamed Denver Museum Natural History and then the Denver Museum of Nature & Science) in the anthropology department until it closed in 1968. Her appointment as a curator spanned 33 years. She was advised by E. B. Renaud to fill the gap at the museum, which was missing archaeology as a discipline. Wormington, in assistance with Betty Holmes, headed the newly-formed Department of Archaeology in 1936. Wormington earned her M.A. and Ph.D at Radcliffe while still being considered as a "curator of archaeology" at the Museum, and was able to return to and resume her career at the Museum once she earned her degrees. Because of her background as one of the foremost authorities on the subject of Paleo Indian studies, the museum was able to establish a formidable reputation. While working at the museum and before obtaining her MA and Ph.D., Wormington wrote Ancient Man in North America and Prehistoric Indians of the South West.

In her first year at the Museum, in 1936, Wormington supervised and contributed scientific material to the program providing tours to children of the exhibits at the Museum.

Ancient Man in North America was the first comprehensive compilation of the Pleistocene and the early Holocene occupations found in North America. This book went through over a dozen revisions and was considered a classic in the field of Paleo Indian archaeology. The information within the book supplied a generation of archaeologists with an in-depth summary of research.

Prehistoric Indians in the South West also went through several revisions and was used as a standard text during the late 1940s and early 1950s. Shortly after this publication, she developed an exhibit at the museum titled “Hall of Man.” This exhibit on American prehistoric people was completed in 1956, working closely with Arminta Neal and Mary Chilton Gray for research, planning, and acquisition of materials for the exhibit. The exhibit remained in the Denver Museum of Nature & Science until the year 2000.

In 1940, Wormington married George D. Volk, a petroleum geologist and engineer, but she chose to keep her maiden name. During World War II, Wormington took a leave of absence from the museum to travel with Volk until he was sent overseas. At this point she returned to the museum. Volk died in 1980, after 40 years of marriage. During those years he supported Wormington’s career by building screens and repairing shovels to be used during excavations as well as taking on dish duty at camp.

== Employment ==
In 1936 Wormington started cataloging all of the artifacts from the Lindenmeier site in Colorado at the Colorado Museum of Natural History. The Lindenmeier site is one of the first Paleo Indian camps to be excavated. The tools found were often associated with extinct bison. Wormington was in charge of the comparison of these artifacts with those found in Europe.

While working at the museum, Wormington began her own research at the Montrose Rock Shelters and the Johnson site. Along with her work in Colorado, she also participated in excavations at the Fremont village site in Utah. The research collected at the Fremont site supplied the evidence needed for Wormington to conclude in her report that the Fremont culture originated in the ancient Desert Culture of the Great Basin. Throughout her career at the Colorado Museum of Natural History, Wormington assisted as well as acted as a consultant for many famous sites for Paleo Indian culture in the New World. During these years Hannah Marie Wormington became a close friend and later a mentor to several aspiring archaeologies such as Cynthia Irwin Williams and her brother Henry Irwin. Marie, as they knew her, always encouraged them to ask questions and pursue anthropology as a career.

After a scheduled leave-of-absence in 1968, Wormington was dismissed from her position by the museum director at the time, Alfred M. Bailey. Multiple theories surrounding the true circumstances of the end of her museum career exist, and it is not entirely clear whether it was Wormington's choice, if it was budgetary constraints, if there were conflicts of interests between her museum work and her fieldwork, among others.

=== Significant site excavations ===
- 1935- Dordogne, France
- 1936- Montrose Rock Shelter, Colorado
- 1936- Johnson site (a minor Folsom camp), La Porte, Colorado
- 1939 to 1948- Turner ranch, Utah (doctoral research)
- 1953- Consultant for a mammoth excavation in the Valley of Mexico
- 1955- Consultant for excavation of human remains near Turin Iowa
- 1955 and 1956- prehistoric migration routes of ancient hunters in the Province of Alberta, Canada.
- 1960-Frazier Agate Basin site; with Joe Ben Wheat at the Jurgens Cody site Weld County, Colorado.
- 1963- Consultant for the excavations at Onion Portage, Alaska

After working at the museum until 1968, Wormington was a popular visiting professor and lecturer at a number of universities starting at Arizona State University where she taught from 1968 to 1969. From ASU, she returned to Colorado and taught at Colorado College (1969–1970). Following a three-year break, Wormington taught in 1973 at the University of Minnesota while acting as an adjunct professor at Colorado College, a position she held until 1986.

== Achievements ==
In the same year she left the Colorado Museum (1968), Wormington was the first female archaeologist to be elected president of the Society for American Archaeology. She had previously held the title of vice president twice (1950–51, 1955–56). She was awarded a Guggenheim fellowship in 1970, and in 1977 she was awarded an honorary doctor of letters from Colorado state university. In 1983, the Society of American Archaeology awarded her the Distinguished Service Award, being the first female archaeologist to receive the award. Just two years later she was awarded the Colorado Archaeology Society C.T. Hurst award for her significant role in Colorado Archaeology. She was inducted into the Colorado Women's Hall of Fame in 1985. In 1988 she was once again awarded honorary doctor of letters degree from Colorado College, the same year she was appointed the curator emeritus of the Denver Museum of Natural History. Steve Cassels has written, "Just as Margaret Mead did in cultural anthropology, Marie has paved the way for women in archaeology, having persevered despite various degrees of discrimination throughout her career."

== Death ==
Wormington died in her home in Denver on May 31, 1994 due to smoke inhalation after a fire that had started in the living room where she was sleeping. She had fallen asleep on the couch after lighting a cigarette; that cigarette then lit the couch on fire.

== Legacy ==
The material components of Hannah Marie Wormington's life are documented and stored by the National Anthropological Archives (NAA) at the Smithsonian. These papers, films, notes, manuscripts, publications, proposals, and more were published and generated between 1930 and 1993, and include aspects of both her professional publications and more private correspondences.

Not only was Wormington the first woman to serve as president for the Society for American Archaeology, but she is also the first woman to receive a PhD from Harvard (Radcliffe) in Anthropology.

== Selected books and papers ==
Wormington, H. M.

- 1939- Ancient Man in North America
- 1947- Prehistoric Indians of the Southwest
- 1955- A Reappraisal of the Freemont Culture, with a Summary of the Archaeology of the Northern Periphery. Denver Museum of Natural History, Proceedings No. 1
- 1977- Archeology of the Late and Post-Pliocene from a New World perspective. In Paleoanthropology in the People's Republic of China. W. W. Howells and Patricia Jones Tsuchitani, eds. Washington, DC: National Academy of Sciences.
- 1979- (Obituary) William Thomas Malloy, 1917–1978. American Antiquity 44(3)
- 1983 Early Man in the New World: 1970–1980. In Early Man in the New World. Richard Shutler, Jr., ed. Berkeley: Sage Publications.

Wormington H. M. and Betty Holmes

- 1937- The differentiation of Yuma Points
- 1937-A comparison of Folsom and Yuma Flaking Techniques

Wormington, H.M. and Robert Lister

- 1956- Archaeological Investigations of the Uncomphgre Plateau. Denver Museum of Natural History, Proceedings No. 2

Wormington, H.M and Richard Forbis

- 1965- An Introduction to the Archaeology of Alberta, Canada, Denver Museum of Natural History Proceedings No. 11

Wormington, H. M. and D. Ellis (editors)

- 1967- Pleistocene Studies in Southern Nevada. Nevada State Museum, Anthropological Papers No. 13, Carson City
- 1948- A proposed Revision of the Yuma Point Terminology; Proceedings, Colorado Museum of Natural History, Vol. 18, No. 2
- 1962- A Survey of Early American Prehistory. American Scientist 50(1): 230-42.
