= Archaic period (North America) =

Period from c. 8000 to 1000 BC in North America

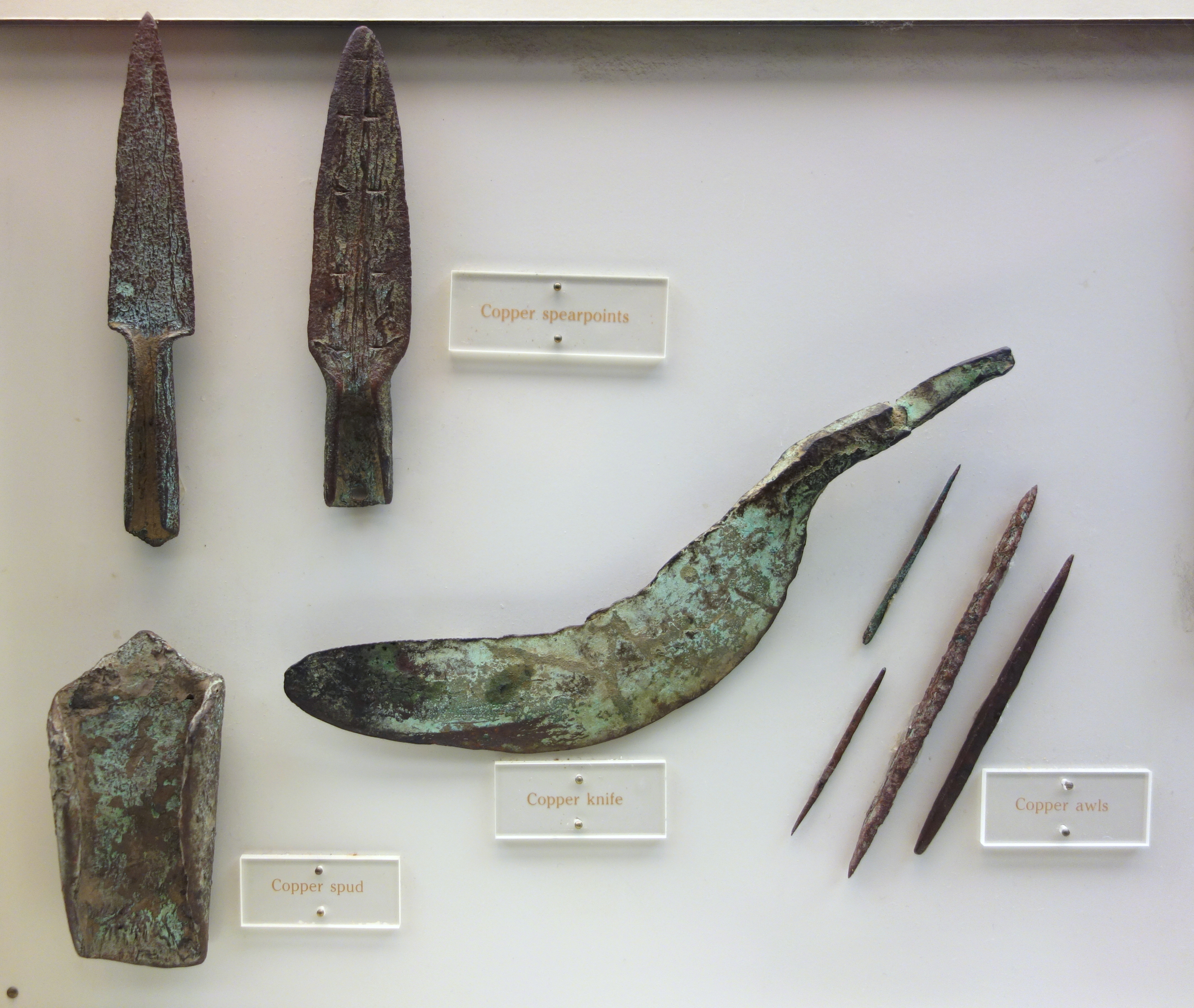
Copper knife, spearpoints, awls, and spud, from the Late Archaic period, Wisconsin, 3000–1000 BC

In the classification of the archaeological cultures of North America, the Archaic period in North America, taken to last from around 8000 to 1000 BC in the sequence of North American pre-Columbian cultural stages, is a period defined by the archaic stage of cultural development. The Archaic stage is characterized by subsistence economies supported through the exploitation of nuts, seeds, and shellfish. As its ending is defined by the adoption of sedentary farming, this date can vary significantly across the Americas.

The term "Archaic Period" is also as a timespan label elsewhere in the Americas, with different timespans than the North American Archaic.

== Classifications ==
This classification system was first proposed by Gordon Willey and Philip Phillips in the widely accepted 1958 book Method and Theory in American Archaeology.

In the organization of the system, the Archaic period followed the Lithic stage and is superseded by the Formative stage.

1. The Lithic stage
2. The Archaic stage
3. The Formative stage
4. The Classic stage
5. The Post-Classic stage

Numerous local variations have been identified within the cultural rankings. The period has been subdivided by region and then time. For instance, the Archaic Southwest tradition is subdivided into the San Dieguito–Pinto, Oshara, Cochise and Chihuahua cultures.

== Archaic stage in North America ==
Since the 1990s, secure dating of multiple Middle Archaic sites in northern Louisiana, Mississippi and Florida has challenged traditional models of development. In these areas, hunter-gatherer societies in the Lower Mississippi Valley organized to build monumental earthwork mound complexes as early as 3500 BC (confirmed at Watson Brake), with building continuing over a period of 500 years. Early mound sites such as Frenchman's Bend and Hedgepeth were of this time period; all were constructed by localized societies. Watson Brake is now considered to be the oldest mound complex in the Americas. It precedes that built at Poverty Point by nearly 2,000 years (both are in northern Louisiana). More than 100 sites have been identified as associated with the regional Poverty Point culture of the Late Archaic period, and it was part of a regional trading network across the Southeast.

Across the Southeastern Woodlands, starting around 4000 BC, people exploited wetland resources, creating large shell middens. Middens developed where the people lived along rivers, but there is limited evidence of Archaic peoples along the coastlines prior to 3000 BC. Archaic sites on the coast may have been inundated by rising sea levels (one site in 15 to 20 feet of water off St. Lucie County, Florida, has been dated to 2800 BC). Starting around 3000 BC, evidence of large-scale exploitation of oysters appears. During the period 3000 BC to 1000 BC, shell rings, large shell middens that more or less surround open centers, were developed along the coast. These shell rings are numerous in South Carolina and Georgia but are also found scattered around the Florida Peninsula and along the Gulf of Mexico coast as far west as the Pearl River. In some places, such as Horr's Island in Southwest Florida, resources were rich enough to support sizable mound-building communities year-round. Four shell or sand mounds on Horr's Island have been dated to between 2900 and 2300 BC.

== Timeline ==
=== Early Archaic ===
- 8000 BC: The last glacial period ends, causing sea levels to rise and flood the Beringia land bridge, closing the primary migration route from Siberia.
- 8000 BC: Sufficient rain falls on the American Southwest to support many large mammal species – mammoth, mastodon, and a bison species – that soon go extinct.
- 8000 BC: Hunters in the American Southwest use the atlatl.
- 7500 BC: Early basketry.
- 7560–7370 BC: Kennewick Man dies along the shore of the Columbia River in Washington State, leaving one of the most complete early Native American skeletons.
- 7000 BC: Northeastern peoples depend increasingly on deer, nuts, and wild grains as the climate warms.
- 7000 BC: Native Americans in Lahontan Basin, Nevada mummify their dead to give them honor and respect, evidencing deep concern about their treatment and condition.

=== Middle Archaic ===
- 6500 BC–200 AD: The San Dieguito–Pinto tradition and Chihuahua tradition flourish in the Southwest.
- 6000 BC: Ancestors of Penutian-speaking peoples settle in the Northwestern Plateau.
- 6000 BC: Nomadic hunting bands roam Subarctic Alaska following herds of caribou and other game animals.
- 6000 BC: Aleuts begin to arrive in the Aleutian Islands.
- 5700 BC: Cataclysmic eruption of Mount Mazama in modern-day Oregon.
- 5500 BC–500 AD: Oshara tradition, a Southwestern Archaic tradition, arises in north-central New Mexico, the San Juan Basin, the Rio Grande Valley, southern Colorado, and southeastern Utah.
- Natives of the Northwestern Plateau begin to rely on salmon runs.
- 5000 BC: Early cultivation of food crops began in Mesoamerica.
- 5000 BC: Native Americans in the Pacific Northwest from Alaska to California develop a fishing economy, with salmon as a staple.
- 5000 BC: The Old Copper culture of the Great Lakes area hammers the metal into various tools and ornaments, such as knives, axes, awls, bracelets, rings, and pendants.
- 5000 BC–200 AD: The Cochise tradition arises in the American Southwest.
- 4500 BC: Emergence of the Shield Archaic tradition.
- Native Americans in the northern Great Lakes produce copper tools, ornaments, and utensils traded throughout the Great Plains and Ohio Valley.
- Shell ornaments and copper items at Indian Knoll in Kentucky evidence an extensive trade system over several millennia.
- 4000 BC: Inhabitants of Mesoamerica cultivate maize (corn) while Peruvian natives cultivate beans and squash.
- 4000–1000 BC: Old Copper complex emerges in the Great Lakes region
- 3500 BC: The largest, oldest drive site at Head-Smashed-In Buffalo Jump, Alberta, Canada.
- 3500–3000 BC: Construction of extensive mound complex built at Watson Brake in the floodplain of the Ouachita River near Monroe in northern Louisiana.
- Shell ornaments and copper items at Indian Knoll, Kentucky evidence an extensive trade system over several millennia.

=== Late Archaic ===
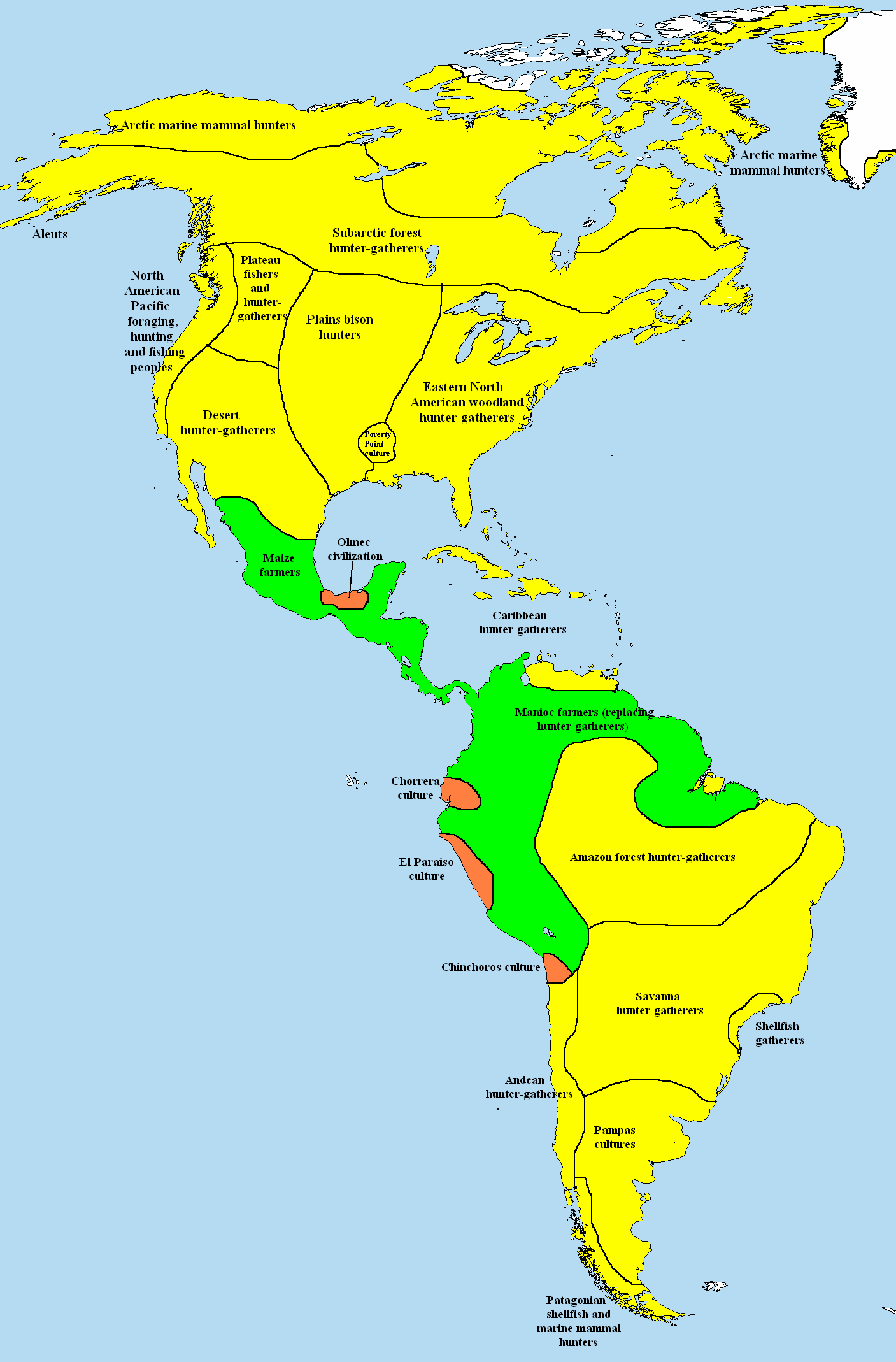
Simplified map of subsistence methods in the Americas at 1000 BC hunter-gatherers simple farming societies complex farming societies

- 3000 BC: Cultivation of the sunflower and marsh elder begins in the American South; northeastern natives cultivate amaranth and marsh elder. After harvesting these plants, the people grind their seeds into flour.
- 3000 BC: The Cochise tradition of the American Southwest begin cultivating a primitive form of maize imported from Mesoamerica; common beans and squash follow later.
- 3000 BC: Native Americans of the Pacific Northwest begin to exploit shellfish resources.
- 3000 BC: Fishing in the Northwestern Plateau increases.
- 3000 BC: Natives speaking the Algonquian languages arrive in the Northeastern Woodlands from the south.
- Shell ornaments and copper items at Indian Knoll, Kentucky evidence an extensive trade system over several millennia.
- 2888 BC: People of the Stallings culture on the Savannah River begin making pottery, at a time that pottery making was spreading in South America, but had not reached Mesoamerica.
- 2500–800 BC: The Arctic Small Tool tradition develops on the Alaska Peninsula, near Bristol Bay, and on the eastern shores of the Bering Strait in Alaska.
- 2500–1800 BC: Aleutian tradition emerges in Alaska.
- 2500 BC: Independence I people enter Greenland from North America. The last archaeological evidence of Independence I is from 1730 BC.
- 2400 BC: Saqqaq people enter Greenland from Siberia and live there until 400 BC.
- 2500 BC: The Cochise tradition become skilled farmers of the American Southwest.
- 2100 BC: Maize cultivation begins in Aridoamerica.
- 2000–1000 BC: Poverty Point culture in northeastern Louisiana features stonework, flintknapping, earthenware, and effigy, conical, and platform mounds, as well as planned settlements on concentric earthen ridges
- 1500 BC: Salishan speakers arrive in Northwestern Plateau region.
- 1500 BC–1000 AD: Intermediate Horizon (or Campbell tradition) emerged among Indigenous peoples of California
- 1000 BC: Athapaskan-speaking natives arrive in the North American Arctic, possibly from Siberia.
- 1000 BC: Pottery making widespread in the Eastern woodlands.

== Shield Archaic ==
The Shield Archaic was a distinct regional tradition which existed during the climatic optimum, starting around 6,500 years ago. During this warm period, forests advanced northward and temperatures were warmer than they were in the late 20th century. It is associated with the northern frontier and transition area between boreal forest and tundra in what is now northern Saskatchewan and the Northwest Territories, near Lake Athabasca. However, the Late Shield Archaic phase (3,500–4,450 BP) has sites as far as Manitoba, and archaeologists have investigated suspected Shield Archaic sites as far away as Killarney Provincial Park near Georgian Bay in Ontario.

The prominent Canadian archaeologist J. V. Wright argued in 1976 that the Shield Archaic had emerged from the Northern Plano tradition, but this was questioned by Bryan C. Gordon in a 1996 publication. Shield Archaic tools differed in design between "forest" and "tundra" sites. Pushplanes have been found, which would have been used for planing wood, bone, or antler. Shield Archaic people hunted caribou, with a focus on water crossings as hunting places.

== See also ==
Elsewhere

- Archaic period in Mesoamerica
- Archaic period in Belize
- Archaic–Early Basketmaker period

Other

- Archaeology of the Americas
- List of pre-Columbian cultures
- List of archaeological periods (North America)
- Prehistoric Southwestern cultural divisions (North America)
- Pre-Columbian South America
- Mesolithic
