= Salmon Ruins =

- Salmon Ruin
- U.S. National Register of Historic Places
- NM State Register of Cultural Properties
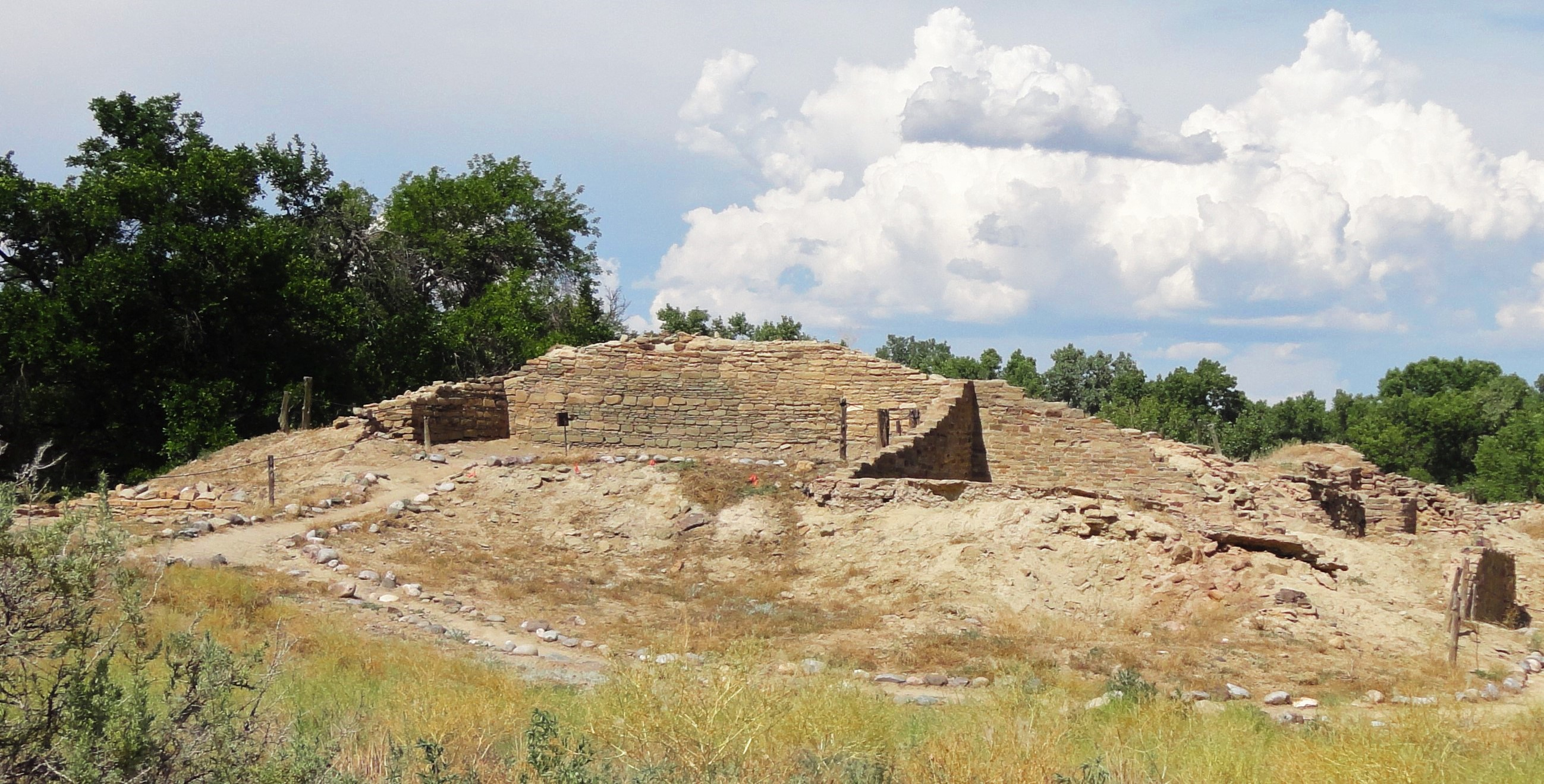
- Salmon Ruins, central room block
- Nearest city: Farmington, New Mexico
- Coordinates: 36°42′4.3″N 108°1′38.1″W
- Area: 19 acres (7.7 ha)
- Built: 1089
- NRHP reference No.: 70000406
- NMSRCP No.: 21

Significant dates
- Added to NRHP: September 4, 1970
- Designated NMSRCP: December 20, 1968

Salmon Ruins is an ancient Chacoan and Pueblo site located in the northwest corner of New Mexico, USA. Salmon was constructed by migrants from Chaco Canyon around 1090 CE, with 275 to 300 original rooms spread across three stories, an elevated tower kiva in its central portion, and a great kiva in its plaza. Subsequent use by local Middle San Juan people (beginning in the 1120s) resulted in extensive modifications to the original building, with the reuse of hundreds of rooms, division of many of the original large, Chacoan rooms into smaller rooms, and emplacement of more than 20 small kivas into pueblo rooms and plaza areas. The site was occupied by ancient Ancestral Puebloans until the 1280s, when much of the site was destroyed by fire and abandoned (Reed 2006b).

The pueblo is situated on the north bank of the San Juan River, just to the west of the modern town of Bloomfield, New Mexico, and about 45 miles (72 km) north of Pueblo Bonito in Chaco Canyon. The site was built on the first alluvial terrace above the San Juan River floodplain.

== Excavation ==
The ruins of Salmon Pueblo were excavated between 1970 and 1979, under the direction of Cynthia Irwin-Williams of Eastern New Mexico University in partnership with the San Juan County Museum Association (Irwin-Williams 2006, p. 17-27). The San Juan Valley Archaeological Program resulted in the excavation of slightly more than one-third of Salmon's ground floor rooms. More than 1.5 million artifacts and samples were recovered from Salmon. In 1980, Irwin-Williams and co-principal investigator Phillip Shelley wrote, compiled and edited a multivolume, 1,500-page report. The document fulfilled the reporting requirements for the series of grants under which the project had been completed but it was not intended for publication. Throughout the 1980s, Irwin-Williams and Shelley worked on a modified and greatly reduced manuscript, with the goal of producing a publishable report. This work ended with the untimely death of Cynthia Irwin-Williams in 1990.

In 2000, Archaeology Southwest (formerly the Center for Desert Archaeology) President Bill Doelle and staff met with Salmon Executive Director Larry Baker and forged a multiyear partnership. Archaeology Southwest's work at Salmon began in 2001 as the Salmon Reinvestment and Research Program, with archaeologist Paul Reed leading the effort. The research initiative comprised two primary tasks: first, to condense and edit the original 1980 Salmon report into a new, published technical report, and second, to conduct additional, primary research in several targeted areas, with the goal of producing material for a detailed technical report, as well as a synthetic volume. The three-volume report, entitled Thirty-Five Years of Archaeological Research at Salmon Ruins, New Mexico, was published in 2006 (Reed 2006a), followed by the synthetic-summary volume Chaco’s Northern Prodigies, published in 2008 (Reed 2008a). An additional component of the Archaeology Southwest effort at Salmon focused on the curation needs of the massive collection. These needs were partially addressed through a Save America's Treasures grant for $150,000 awarded in 2002. The curation effort (repackaging and reboxing artifacts) has continued over the last 10 years.

== Construction and occupation ==
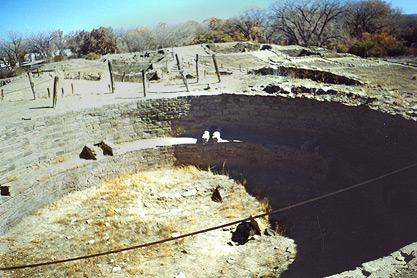
The tower kiva at Salmon Ruins

Hundreds of tree-ring dates from Salmon indicate that the first and perhaps second stories were built between 1090 and 1095, using wood cut over a decade. The plan of the Salmon great house is very similar to that of Hungo Pavi in Chaco Canyon and nearby Aztec Ruins, built after Salmon between 1100 and 1125. The Chacoan occupation of Salmon ended by 1125, but the site was not abandoned. Subsequent use by local Middle San Juan Puebloans occurred from 1125 to the 1280s. After 1200, during the San Juan period, the site saw increased activity and population and contact with Puebloans across the greater San Juan area. Although residents at Salmon traded with people from the Mesa Verde or Northern San Juan region, few people from Mesa Verde actually migrated to Salmon Pueblo (Reed 2009, p. 58).

At the end of its occupation in the 1280s, much of Salmon Pueblo was intentionally burned. Several rooms on the western side of the Pueblo contained bushels of corn that were consumed in the fire. On the burned roof of the Tower Kiva in Salmon's central roomblock, nearly 20 children and several adults were partially cremated at the site's abandonment. This event was originally interpreted as an act of warfare, with the deceased killed as a result of the fire. However, more detailed, subsequent analyses have revealed a much more complicated situation with the final cremation of the individuals at abandonment and little or no evidence for warfare.

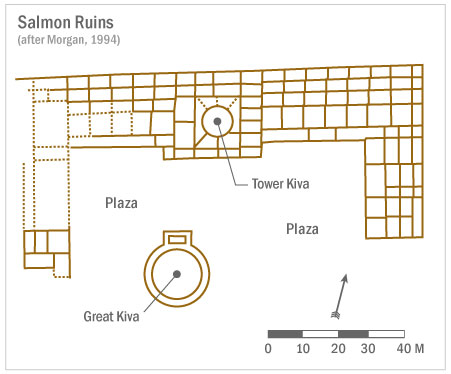

== Architecture ==
The walls of the Salmon great house were constructed of thin sandstone slabs in the classic Chaco Canyon style; Chaco veneer types II, III, and IV are represented. The structure is rectangular in shape and is oriented with its long axis running roughly east–west. The long back (north) wall of the ruin is roughly 400 feet (120 m) long.

The ground floor contained 150 rooms arranged into 25 suites with generally four rooms each; these are interpreted as family dwelling units. The room suites and other evidence of residential usage indicate that Salmon Pueblo was used as a primary great house residence during the Chacoan period, in contrast to other Chacoan great houses. Two roomblocks extend southward from each end of the rear section, enclosing a large plaza. The plaza contains a great kiva similar to the reconstructed one at Aztec Ruins. There is also an elevated "tower kiva" situated in the center of the main roomblock.

The rooms are roofed with large wooden beams and stringers (also known as vigas and latillas) in the style of most ancient and modern pueblo structures. The logs used as beams were cut from ponderosa pine, Douglas fir, spruce, and other large trees that had to be transported to the site from as far away as 40 miles (60 km).

The great kiva measures about 58 feet (18 m) in diameter. The roof of the kiva was supported by four large columns built of alternating layers of stone and wood. These columns, in turn, support large conifer beams which held the massive roof. Salmon Pueblo contained other special function rooms, as well, including four milling rooms, two rooms with archaeo-astronomical features, and two rooms that served as workshops for making and repairing metates and other stone tools.

== Preservation and interpretation ==
In the late nineteenth century, Peter Milton Salmon, his son George Salmon, and their families homesteaded the property. Peter was born in Indiana in 1844 and died in Los Angeles in 1937. Before settling in New Mexico, he lived in southern Colorado, where he married Maria Encarnacion Archuleta, a member of an old New Mexican family. The Salmon homestead and outbuildings remain near the ruin and have been preserved as part of Salmon's Heritage Park. The Salmons, and later owner Charles Dustin, provided protection for the site.

The non-profit San Juan County Museum Association acquired the 22-acre (8.9 ha) tract of land containing the ancient site and the Salmon Family settlement in 1969. San Juan County made the final purchase of the property, and the association operates the facility under a lease agreement.

The Salmon Ruins Museum, located on the property, opened in 1973. It includes exhibits of artifacts found at the site, as well as rotating exhibits of regional interest topics. The museum, pueblo, and Salmon homestead are all open to the public.

A digital archive of records from the Salmon Ruins excavations was launched in May 2018.

The site was placed on the New Mexico State Register of Cultural Properties and the National Register of Historic Places in 1970.

== See also ==
- National Register of Historic Places listings in San Juan County, New Mexico

== Notes ==
- Irwin-Williams, C., 2006. "1980 Introduction", Thirty-Five Years of Archaeological Research at Salmon Ruins, New Mexico: Volume One: Introduction, Architecture, Chronology, and Conclusions, p. 17-27. Center for Desert Archaeology, Tucson, and Salmon Ruins Museum, New Mexico.
- Reed, P. F. (editor)(2006a). Thirty-Five Years of Archaeological Research at Salmon Ruins, New Mexico: Volume One: Introduction, Architecture, Chronology, and Conclusions, Center for Desert Archaeology, Tucson, and Salmon Ruins Museum, New Mexico.
- Reed, P. F., (2006b). "Introduction", Thirty-Five Years of Archaeological Research at Salmon Ruins, New Mexico: Volume One: Introduction, Architecture, Chronology, and Conclusions, p. 1-15. Center for Desert Archaeology, Tucson, and Salmon Ruins Museum, New Mexico.
- Reed, P. F. (editor) (2008a). Chaco’s Northern Prodigies, University of Utah Press.
- Reed, P.F. (2009). "The Middle San Juan: Mesa Verde South? Chaco North? Or, a Region Unto Itself?" A Century of Research at Mesa Verde National Park, Mesa Verde Museum Association.
- Reed, P.F. and A. James (2006). "The Ruins of Salmon Pueblo in Historical Context". Thirty-Five Years of Archaeological Research at Salmon Ruins, New Mexico: Volume One: Introduction, Architecture, Chronology, and Conclusions, p. 41-56. Center for Desert Archaeology, Tucson, and Salmon Ruins Museum, New Mexico.
