= Chihuahua tradition =

Pre-Columbian culture in modern New Mexico and Chihuahua

The Chihuahua (Southeastern) tradition (c. 6000 BC – c. AD 250) as a culture of south-central New Mexico and Chihuahua is still poorly defined. It probably includes several local adaptations that evolved over long periods of time. Irwin-Williams' hypothesis of four interacting Southwestern Archaic traditions, which differ from other traditions such as the Plains Archaic, is still provisional.

== See also ==
- Archaic period in the Americas
- Archaic stage
- Cochise tradition
- Pecos Classification
- Southwestern United States

== Bibliography ==
- Cordell, Linda S. (1984). Prehistory of the Southwest. New York: Academic Press.
- Fagan, Brian M. (2000). Ancient North America: The archaeology of a continent (3rd ed.). New York: Thames and Hudson.
- Irwin-Williams, Cynthia. (1979). Post-pleistocene archeology, 7000-2000 B.C. In A. Ortiz (Ed.), Handbook of North American Indians: Southwest (Vol. 9, pp. 31–42). Washington, D.C.: Smithsonian Institution.
