= Archaic Southwest =

Indigenous North American culture circa 6500 BCE and 200 CE

The Archaic Southwest was the culture of the North American Southwest between 6500 BC and 200 AD (approximately).

== Paleo-Indian era ==
The Paleo-Indian tradition before that dates from 10,500 BC to 7500 BC. The Southwestern United States during the Archaic time frame can be identified or defined culturally in two separate ways:

1. Agriculture, pottery styles and public architecture – People of the southwest had a variety of subsistence strategies, all using their own specific techniques. Crops included maize, beans, and squash. The earliest known maize cultivation in the Southwest is about 2100 BC. Settlements grew larger as agriculture became more important in subsistence.
2. The absence of Formal Social Stratification, large cities, writing, and major architecture.

== Archaic era ==
As the climate warmed at the end of the Ice Age, mammoths and large animals such as horses and camels began to disappear. Hunter/gatherers gradually adapted to these changes, supplementing their diet with a variety of plant foods and smaller game. The Archaic people used nets and the atlatl to hunt water fowl, ducks, small animals and antelope. Hunting was especially important in winter and spring months when plant foods were scarce.

The Archaic time frame is defined culturally as a transition from a hunting/gathering lifestyle to one involving agriculture and permanent, if only seasonally occupied, settlements. In the Southwest, the Archaic is generally dated from 8000 years ago to approximately 1800 to 2000 years ago. During this time the people of the southwest developed a variety of subsistence strategies, all using their own specific techniques. The nutritive value of weed and grass seeds was discovered and flat rocks were used to grind flour to produce gruels and breads. This use of grinding slabs in about 7500 BCE marks the beginning of the Archaic tradition. Small bands of people traveled throughout the area, gathering plants such as cactus fruits, mesquite beans, acorns, and pine nuts. Archaic people established camps at collection points, and returned to these places year after year. They lived primarily in the open, but probably also built temporary shelters. Known artifacts include nets woven with plant fibers and rabbit skin, woven sandals, gaming sticks, and animal figures made from split-twigs.

Late in the Archaic Period, corn, probably introduced into the region from central Mexico, was planted near camps with permanent water access. After planting, it appears the hunter-gatherers moved on to other territory to gather wild foods, and returned later in the season to harvest the ripened grain. Archaeologist Wirt H. Wills asserts that corn was originally introduced into the Southwest when the region's climate was somewhat wetter and cooler. Distinct types of corn have been identified in the more well-watered highlands and the desert areas, which may imply local mutation or successive introduction of differing species. Emerging domesticated crops also included beans and squash.

About 3,500 years ago, climate change led to changing patterns in water sources. The population of Desert Archaic people appears to have dramatically decreased. However, family-based groups took shelter in caves and rock overhangs within canyon walls, many facing south to capitalize on warmth from the sun during winter. Occasionally, these people lived in small semisedentary hamlets or pueblos in open areas. Evidence of significant occupation has been found in the northern part of the Southwest range, from Utah to Colorado, especially in the vicinity of modern Durango, Colorado.

Archaic cultural traditions include:

1. Archaic–Early Basketmaker (7000 BC – 1500 BC)
2. San Dieguito–Pinto (6500 BC – 200 AD)
3. Oshara (5500 BC – 600 AD)
4. The Cochise (before 5000 BC – 200 BC)
5. Chihuahua (6000 BC – 250 AD)
6. Oasisamerica cultures (3500 BC – 1300 AD).

== Contemporary cultural traditions ==
Many contemporary cultural traditions exist within the southwest, but there are four major ones.

1. Yuman-speaking peoples, including the Paipai, Havasupai, Yavapai, Walapai, Mohave, Quechan, Maricopa, Tipai-Ipai, Cocopa, and Kiliwa people They inhabit the Colorado River valley, the uplands, and Baja California.
2. O'odham peoples, including the Akimel O'odham and Tohono O'odham. They inhabit Southern Arizona, and northern Sonora.
3. Pueblo peoples: Descendents of the Basketmaker and Cochise cultures. Also includes the related Hopi and Zuni peoples. Once inhabiting the Four Corners Region, they today inhabit the Rio Grande Valley in New Mexico and areas to the west in Arizona and New Mexico. Different Pueblos speak completely different languages from several language families.
4. Southern Athabaskan: Apache and the Navajo peoples: Their ancestral roots trace back to Athabaskan-speaking peoples in Canada and eastern Alaska. They probably entered the southwest from the 12th to 16th centuries.

== See also ==
- Oasisamerica
- List of dwellings of Pueblo peoples
