= Cynthia Irwin-Williams =

American archaeologist (1936–1990)

- Cynthia Irwin-Williams in 1964
- Born: April 14, 1936; Denver, Colorado
- Died: 15 June 1990 (aged 54); Reno, Nevada
- Education: Radcliffe College (BA, MA); Harvard University (PhD)
- Known for: Picosa culture; Oshara tradition
- Scientific career
- Fields: Anthropology, Archaeology

Cynthia Irwin-Williams (April 14, 1936 – June 15, 1990) was an archaeologist of the prehistoric American Southwest. She received a B.A. in Anthropology from Radcliffe College in 1957; the next year she received a M.A. in the same field. In 1963 she completed her educational career in Anthropology with a PhD. from Harvard University. Beginning her career in the 1950s, Irwin-Williams was considered a groundbreaker for women in archaeology, like her friend and supporter Hannah Marie Wormington.

== Archaeological career ==
She worked with her brother, Henry Thomas Johnson Irwin, a fellow archaeologist, in Colorado from the mid-1950s to 1960. In 1966 Irwin-Williams and her brother published a book of her findings from the Magic Mountain site excavation performed for the Peabody Museum of Harvard University in 1959–1960. They also worked on the nearby and related LoDaisKa site between 1958 and 1960.

In the 1960s she defined the Picosa culture, an Archaic culture of people from three locations with interconnected artifacts and lifestyles. It was named by Irwin-Williams for those areas: Pinto Basin (PI), Cochise tradition (CO) and San Jose (SA), which all together is "Picosa". Irwin-Williams developed the sequence of Archaic culture for the Oshara tradition, which followed the Picosa culture, during her work in the Arroyo Cuervo area of northwestern New Mexico. Irwin contended that the Ancient Pueblo People, or Anasazi, developed, at least in part, from the Oshara.

In 1962, Irwin-Williams led the team that first excavated the Hueyatlaco site in Mexico. The site became mired in controversy about the age of human habitation in the site, and Irwin-Williams never published a final report on the excavation despite decades of research.

Irwin-Williams lectured at Hunter College in New York in 1963-1964. She then moved to Eastern New Mexico University where she taught from 1964-1982, where she held the endowed Llano Estacado Distinguished Research Professorship from 1978 to 1982. Irwin-Williams moved to Reno, Nevada in 1982 to her new appointment as the executive director of the Social Science Center, Desert Research Institute, later achieving the position of Research Professor, Quaternary Science Center in 1988, which she held until her untimely death in 1990 at age 54.

She was active in many professional organizations, holding officer positions or committee memberships in such groups as the Society for American Archaeology (SAA) (Executive Committee member. She was the second woman to perform as the Society's President (1977 to 1979). Irwin-Williams served as Chair of the SAA Federal Archaeology Committee (1979 to 1984), member of the Committee on Native American Relations from 1974 to 1976, member of the Executive Committee of the American Quaternary Association and the Nevada Council on Professional Archaeology. She was a Fellow of the American Anthropological Association and served on various research panels for the National Science Foundation and the National Endowment for the Humanities.

Irwin-Williams authored over 60 publications in archaeology and related fields.

== Personal life ==
Cynthia Irwin-Williams was born April 14, 1936, in Denver, Colorado. After a long chronic illness, Irwin-Williams died on June 15, 1990, in Reno, Nevada.

== Publications ==
For an additional partial list of her papers, see pages 2-5 in ref.

Irwin, Henry J.; Irwin, Cynthia C. (1966). Excavations at Magic Mountain: A Diachronic Study of Plains-Southwest Relations. Denver Museum of Natural History Proceedings Number 12. October 20, 1966.

Irwin-Williams, Cynthia, and C.Vance Haynes, Jr. (1970). "Climatic Change and Early Population Dynamics in the Southwestern United States." Quaternary Research. 1(1):59-71.

Irwin-Williams, Cynthia. (September 1973). "The Oshara Tradition: Origins of Anasazi Culture." Eastern New Mexico University Contributions in Anthropology. 5(1) Portales: Eastern New Mexico University Paleo-Indian Institute.

Irwin-Williams, Cynthia. (1979). "Post-Pleistocene Archaeology, 7000-2000 B.C." in Handbook of North American Indians. Washington, D.C.: Smithsonian Institution Press. 9 Southwest:31-42.

Irwin-Williams, Cynthia; Shelley, Phillip H. (editors) (1980). Investigations at the Salmon Site: The Structure of Chacoan Society in the Northern Southwest. Portales: Eastern New Mexico University Publications in Anthropology.

Irwin-Williams, Cynthia; Baker, Larry L. Baker (editors) (1991). Anasazi Puebloan Adaptation in Response to Climatic Stress: Prehistory of the Middle Rio Puerco Valley. pp. 325–341. On file, Bureau of Land Management, Albuquerque, NM.
