= Cochise tradition =

Archeological era in the present-day southwestern United States

The Cochise tradition (also Cochise culture) is the southern archaeological tradition of the four Southwestern Archaic traditions, in the present-day Southwestern United States.

The Cochise Tradition (Culture), also known as the Desert Archaic or Southwest Archaic Tradition, is dated to around 9000-c. 8000 B.C.E. and is generally known in the Archaic Period (Culley).

The Cochise tradition lasted nearly five millennia, from c. 5000 until c. 200 BC. Its earliest manifestation is known as Sulphur Spring; its two later phases, the Chiricahua and San Pedro, are much better known. The Cochise tradition was named after Lake Cochise, an ancient lake now found in the Willcox Playa of Cochise County, Arizona. The Cochise tradition appears to be ancestral to the prehistoric Mogollon (Mimbres) and Hohokam traditions.

The Cochise tradition is part of the Picosa culture, which encapsulates the Archaic lifestyles of people from three locations with interconnected artifacts and lifestyles. It was named by Cynthia Irwin-Williams in the 1960s for those areas: Pinto Basin (PI), Cochise tradition (CO), and San Jose (SA), which together are called "Picosa".

== Chiricahua phase ==
Chiricahua Cochise tools include a variety of projectile points and many seed-processing artifacts. The phase has been dated to between about 3500 and 1500 BC, but its beginnings may be much earlier. Its chronology has been formulated on the basis of occupations in the Ventana Cave (near Sells, Arizona) and from other locations in Arizona and western New Mexico.

== San Pedro phase ==
The San Pedro phase follows the Chiricahua phase, characterized by large projectile points with corner or side notches and straight or convex bases. Provisional radiocarbon dates have shown San Pedro flourishing from about 1500 to 200 BC. By this time, the Archaic population of the American Southwest appears to have grown, with groups exploiting a wider range of environmental zones and sometimes living in larger, perhaps more permanent, settlements. Some San Pedro sites contain oval pithouses excavated about 1.6 feet (0.49 m) below ground level. Such dwellings would require considerable effort to build, which would indicate a longer term of occupation. Presumably also San Pedro communities were cultivating maize and other crops.

== See also ==
- Archaic period in the Americas
- Archaic stage
- Chihuahua tradition
- Pecos Classification
- Sulphur Springs Valley
- Southwestern United States

== Bibliography ==
- Cordell, Linda S. (1984). Prehistory of the Southwest. New York: Academic Press.
- Fagan, Brian M. (2000). Ancient North America: The archaeology of a continent (3rd ed.). New York: Thames and Hudson.
- Irwin-Williams, Cynthia. (1979). Post-pleistocene archeology, 7000-2000 B.C. In A. Ortiz (Ed.), Handbook of North American Indians: Southwest (Vol. 9, pp. 31–42). Washington, D.C.: Smithsonian Institution.
