= Oshara tradition =

Native American traditions

Oshara Tradition
- Geographical range: New Mexico, Colorado
- Period: Archaic, Southwestern Archaic Traditions
- Dates: ca. 5,440 BCE to 460 CE
- Type site: Arroyo Cuervo region, New Mexico
- Preceded by: Picosa culture
- Followed by: Ancient Pueblo People

The Oshara Tradition was a Southwestern Archaic tradition centered in the area of the northern tradition of the earlier Picosa culture, now called New Mexico and Colorado. Cynthia Irwin-Williams developed the sequence of Archaic culture for Oshara during her work in the Arroyo Cuervo area of northwestern New Mexico. Irwin contends that the Ancestral Puebloans developed, at least in part, from the Oshara.

== Phases ==
This sequence defines no fewer than six phases of occupation, each identified by Projectile point forms and other less well defined artifacts.

Jay phase (7,450 to 6,750 years before present) (Note: Gibbon and Ames in Archaeology of Prehistoric Native America: An Encyclopedia claim that the Jay phase began at least as early as 8,000 years before present, or 6,050 B.C.) – Artifacts of hunter-gatherers, distinguished from earlier Paleo-Indians, and evidence suggests that people concentrated on hunting and gathering of locally available game and food, often living near canyon heads. Artifacts found include crude stone tools for processing food and long, narrow projectile points.

Bajada phase (6,750 to 5,150 years BP) – Distinguished from the Jay phase by the presence of different projectile points, different hearths, ovens, and more sites.

San Jose phase (6,750 to 3,750 years BP) – Metates and manos were used to process food. There was an increase in both the size and number of sites during this period. Trash heaps were also now found.

Armijo phase (3,750 to 2,750 years BP) – Cultivation of maize began during this period which allowed for food surpluses. A new type of site was introduced, a seasonal site for gathering of up to 50 people, believed to be possible due to the stores of cultivated maize. Irwin-Williams concluded that the Oshara may have been the first Southwestern culture to cultivate crops. Projectile points were different from the concave, short projectile points of other cultures of the northern Colorado Plateau during this time, the Middle Archaic period. Late in the phase the points were serrated, stemmed blades.

En Medio phase (2,750 to 1,550 years BP) – During this period there was again an increase in the number of sites, but generally now at the base of cliffs, and the introduction of the use of storage pits for surplus food. It was roughly analogous to the southwestern Basketmaker culture.

Trujillo phase (starting about 1,550 years BP) – Pottery was introduced during this period.

== Sites ==
Oshara sites have been found near Denver, the Upper Gunnison River basin, and the Mesa Verde area of Colorado and in several sites in New Mexico and Arizona.

== Bibliography ==
- Gibbon, Guy E.; Ames, Kenneth M. (1998). Archaeology of Prehistoric Native America: An Encyclopedia. Taylor & Francis. ISBN 978-0-8153-0725-9.
- Stiger, Mark (15 August 2001). Hunter-Gatherer Archaeology of the Colorado High Country. University Press of Colorado. ISBN 978-0-87081-612-3.

== See also ==
- Outline of Colorado prehistory
- Prehistory of Colorado
