= Charles H. McNutt =

American archaeologist (1928–2017)

Charles Harrison McNutt
- Born: 11 December 1928; Denver, Colorado, U.S.
- Died: 9 December 2017 (aged 88); Memphis, Tennessee, U.S.
- Known for: Anthropological theory/analysis, math concepts in archaeology, cultural resource management; North America.
- Scientific career
- Fields: Anthropologist, Archeologist

Charles Harrison McNutt III (December 11, 1928 – December 9, 2017) was an American archaeologist and a scholar of the prehistoric Southeastern United States. He conducted fieldwork and published works on the archaeology of the American Southwest and the Great Plains in South Dakota. His work emphasized on a strong understanding of cultural history and statistical analysis.

== Early life and education ==
Charles Harrison McNutt III was born in Denver, Colorado on December 11, 1928. The son of an army officer, McNutt spent his early years traveling around the country. He attended Sewannee Military Academy for his last three years of high school, and graduated in 1946 at the rank of Cadet Captain. McNutt attended the University of the South at Sewanee, majoring in mathematics. He excelled in college, earning the highest grades of his freshman class, one of four Rockefeller General Education Board scholarships, and graduated as Valedictorian in 1950. Wanting to expand his interests in graduate school, McNutt enrolled in the Department of Anthropology at the University of New Mexico. After receiving an M.A. in anthropology at New Mexico in 1954 he enrolled in the PhD program at the University of Michigan. He received the PhD in anthropology in 1960.

== Early fieldwork ==
McNutt's first field experience came when he was a crew chief for the summer of 1951 at a non-ceramic cave excavation in Lincoln County, New Mexico, supervised by Dr. Paul Rieter. The site had excellent preservation, and numerous woven goods, such as sandals and, baskets were excavated. McNutt would continue work in the Southwest for the next three years, working both a student and paid crew member on such notable excavations as the Early Pueblo site near Santa Anna in 1953 and the Tesque By-pass Site in 1955. He completed his Master's Thesis for Anthropology, A Re-evaluation of the San Juan Basket Maker Culture, in 1954. McNutt described the theoretical approach of the University of New Mexico curriculum as Boazian, with an emphasis on culture history. In 1955 he started in the Ph.D. program at the University of Michigan for his doctorate in 1955, where he described his education as geared in a more evolutionary anthropological direction. This was during Albert Spaulding’s time at Michigan, an influential archaeologist known for his reliance on quantitative methods for typifying cultures. McNutt's first experience with Southeastern archaeology was during a trip in 1955 as a graduate student to Poverty Point with Albert Spaulding and James B. Griffin, to meet James A. Ford and other noted archaeologists of the time to discuss the site. They subsequently visited Monk's Mound in Cahokia and attended the 14th annual SEAC (Southeastern Archaeological Conference). However, it was not until 1959 that he began work in what would later become his area of expertise, the southeastern United States. McNutt worked continually in the field during this period, excavating and publishing on a number of sites in the Northern Great Plains, although his doctoral dissertation, on the early Puebloan occupation of the Tesque By-pass site, was indicative of his continued interest in the Southwest.

== Archaeological career ==
McNutt's first teaching position was at the University of Tennessee in Knoxville, where he excavated and published on the Melton Hill Reservoir. McNutt stayed at the University of Tennessee two years as an assistant professor, ending in the Spring of 1962. He then took a job at Northern Arizona University in the summer of 1962. After two years at Northern Arizona, where he worked with Bob Euler, McNutt returned to Tennessee in 1964, to Memphis State University (now the University of Memphis), where his presence would lead the program its emphasis on the Southeast from the 1970s onward. Throughout his tenure at Memphis State, McNutt worked excavations throughout the Midsouth and produce numerous publications. At MSU, he taught a wide range of classes for more than 25 years, with subjects ranging from general anthropology and the application of mathematics and statistics to the archaeology of numerous culture areas in prehistoric North America and studies of economics among non-literate cultures. He also worked very closely with graduate students, co-authoring many publications with them. The volume Histories of Southeastern Archaeology is written in his honor. In 1992, McNutt helped establish the Tennessee Council of Professional Archaeologists and served as its president during its initial years.

== Research emphasis ==
McNutt's research interests involved establishing a greater understanding of culture histories, specifically of the Rio Grande Valley in New Mexico, the Missouri River Valley in South Dakota, middle Tennessee, and the Central Mississippi River Valley in the Mid-South. He asserted that a well understood culture history is basic to understanding other cultural processes through the archeological record. These interests have led to considerations of ceramic classification, the use and misuse of statistics in ceramic chronology, and the concept of ceramic phases. Later in life, he evinced greater interests in lithics and projectile point chronology, and regarded himself as an aspiring processual archaeologist.

== Key projects ==
McNutt's first excavation upon returning to Tennessee in 1964 was a survey of non-ceramic sites at Kentucky Lake, which highlighted the effects of wave action following the Lake's formation. The investigations made significant progress in understanding the effects of lake–shore action on artifact weathering and distribution. McNutt also published also extensively on archeological theory and application, as evidenced by his 1971 article "On the Methodological Validity of Frequency Seriation." McNutt asserted that the highly popular method of type-frequency seriation, commonly known as ‘battle-ship curves’ was methodologically unsound, noting the assumptions of unidirectional societal evolution made by the method. McNutt was also known for his close work with his graduate students, who have included many now notable archaeologists, among them Dr. Shannon Tushingham of Washington State University, Dr. Jane Hill of the University of Pennsylvania, Guy Weaver, RPA, with whom McNutt has published on multiple sites, such as the Duncan Tract Site, and Lisa Lumb, with whom he published Units 2 and 6 of the Chucalissa Indian village site. McNutt had written numerous papers and monographs, and edited such books as Prehistory of the Central Mississippi Valley and The Woodland-Mississipian Transition of the Midsouth.

== Death ==
Charles H. McNutt died in Memphis, Tennessee on December 9, 2017, at the age of 88.

== Publications ==
=== Selected books and monographs ===
- Excavation and Interpretation of Early Puebloan Occupations at the Tesuque By-Pass Site and in the Upper Rio Grande Valley. 1959 Doctoral dissertation, University of Michigan.
- "The Missouri Basin Chronology Program", 1959. Prepared for Missouri River Basin Progress Report, Interior Missouri Basin Field Committee, Billings, Mont.
- "Archeological Investigations in the Upper Melton Hill Reservoir", Anderson County, Tennessee, 1960. 1961. MS on file with National Park Service, Region 1; with F. W. Fischer.
- Prehistory of the Central Mississippi Valley. 1996. ed. University of Alabama Press.
- Histories of Southeastern Archaeology. 2002 ed., with Jane Hill and Shannon Tushingham. University of Alabama Press, Tuscaloosa.

=== Selected articles and book chapters ===
- "A Pit House Site near Santa Ana Pueblo",1955. American Antiquity, Vol. 20, No. 3. Co-author with J. W. Allen
- "Archaeological Investigations at Kentucky Lake, Tennessee; 1965". 1967. Memphis State University Anthropology Research Center, Occasional Papers, no. 1. Senior author; with J. Bennett Graham.
- "On the Methodological Validity of Frequency Seriation." 1973. American Antiquity, vol. 38, no. 1, pp. 45–60.
- "Nearest Neighbors, Boundary Effect, and the Old Flag Trick." 1981. American Antiquity, vol. 46, no. 3.
- "The Duncan Tract Site, (40TR27), Trousdale County, Tennessee." 1983. Tennessee Valley Authority, Publications in Anthropology, no. 33. Senior author, with Guy G. Weaver
- Chucalissa: Excavations in Units 2 and 6; 1959–67. 1988. M.S.U. Anthropological Research Center, Occasional Papers, no. 15. (with Lisa Cutts Lumb.)
- A Critical Issue in Tennessee Archaeology. 1992. Tennessee Anthropological Association, Newsletter, vol. 17, no. 1, pp. 1–4.
- Woodland-Mississippian Transition in the Mid-South. 2003. Proceedings of the 22nd Mid-South Archaeological Conference, Memphis, TN. With Stephen Williams and Marvin D. Jeter.
- Calibrated Radiocarbon Chronology for Pinson Mounds and Middle Woodland in the Midsouth. 2004. Southeastern Archaeology 23(1):12-24. With Robert C. Mainfort Jr.
- A Surface Collection from the Kirk Point Site (40HS174), Humphreys County, Tennessee. 2008. Tennessee Archaeology 3(1):25-76. With John Broster and Mark R. Norton.
- The Benton Phenomenon and Middle Archaic Chronology in Adjacent Portions of Tennessee, Mississippi, and Alabama. 2008. Southeastern Archaeology 27:45-50.
- Late Mississippian Phases in the Central Mississippi Valley: a Commentary. 2008. Southeastern Archaeology 27:122-143.
- Hernando De Soto's Route from Chicaça through Northeast Arkansas: a Suggestion. 2009. Southeastern Archaeology 28:165-183. With H. Terry Childs

== Selected academic/research honors ==
- University of the South and General Education Board Scholarship (Rockefeller Foundation), 1950.
- Nominee, Distinguished Teacher Award, Memphis State University (1974)
- Superior Performance in University Research, Memphis State University, 1984.
- Superior Performance in University Research, Memphis State University, 1985.
- Superior Performance in University Research, Memphis State University, 1986.
- Participant, restricted Seminar in Multivariate Analysis for Archeologists, Massachusetts Institute of Technology (1986)
- Participant, one of six archeological guests of Federal Republic of Germany, study tour of institutes and facilities. (1987)
- University Distinguished Teaching Award, University of Memphis, 1998.
