= A. T. Hill =

American archaeologist (1871–1953)

- Born: November 29, 1871; Cisne, Illinois, U.S.
- Died: March 21, 1953 (aged 81); Los Angeles, California
- Known for: Great Plains archaeology; Pawnee archaeology
- Scientific career
- Fields: Archaeology

Asa Thomas Hill (November 29, 1871 – March 21, 1953) was an American businessman and archaeologist. His work on sites in and around Nebraska, with such collaborators as William Duncan Strong and Waldo Wedel, was instrumental in the development of Great Plains archaeology.

== Early life and career ==
Hill was born in 1871 in Cisne, Illinois, the oldest of six children of David D. Hill and Angenora Leak Hill. In about 1875, the family moved to Logan in Phillips County, Kansas. After a brief return to Illinois, they settled permanently on a homestead in Phillips County in 1878.

Hill grew up in a sod house. As a child, he was hidden in a straw stack by his mother during the Northern Cheyenne Exodus. On the frontier, schools and teachers were few, and the responsibilities of an oldest son on a dryland farm were many; Hill's formal education ended in the fourth grade.

At the age of 18, Hill left home to ride the rails throughout the western United States. As he travelled, he worked a variety of odd jobs: dishwasher in a mining camp, photographer, portrait painter, and market hunter. In jumping from a moving freight train, he severely injured an ankle; the injury troubled him for the rest of his life.

Hill returned to Logan, where he and his father opened a general store. He married Mayme Rouse of Plainville, Kansas.

== Hill and the Pike site ==
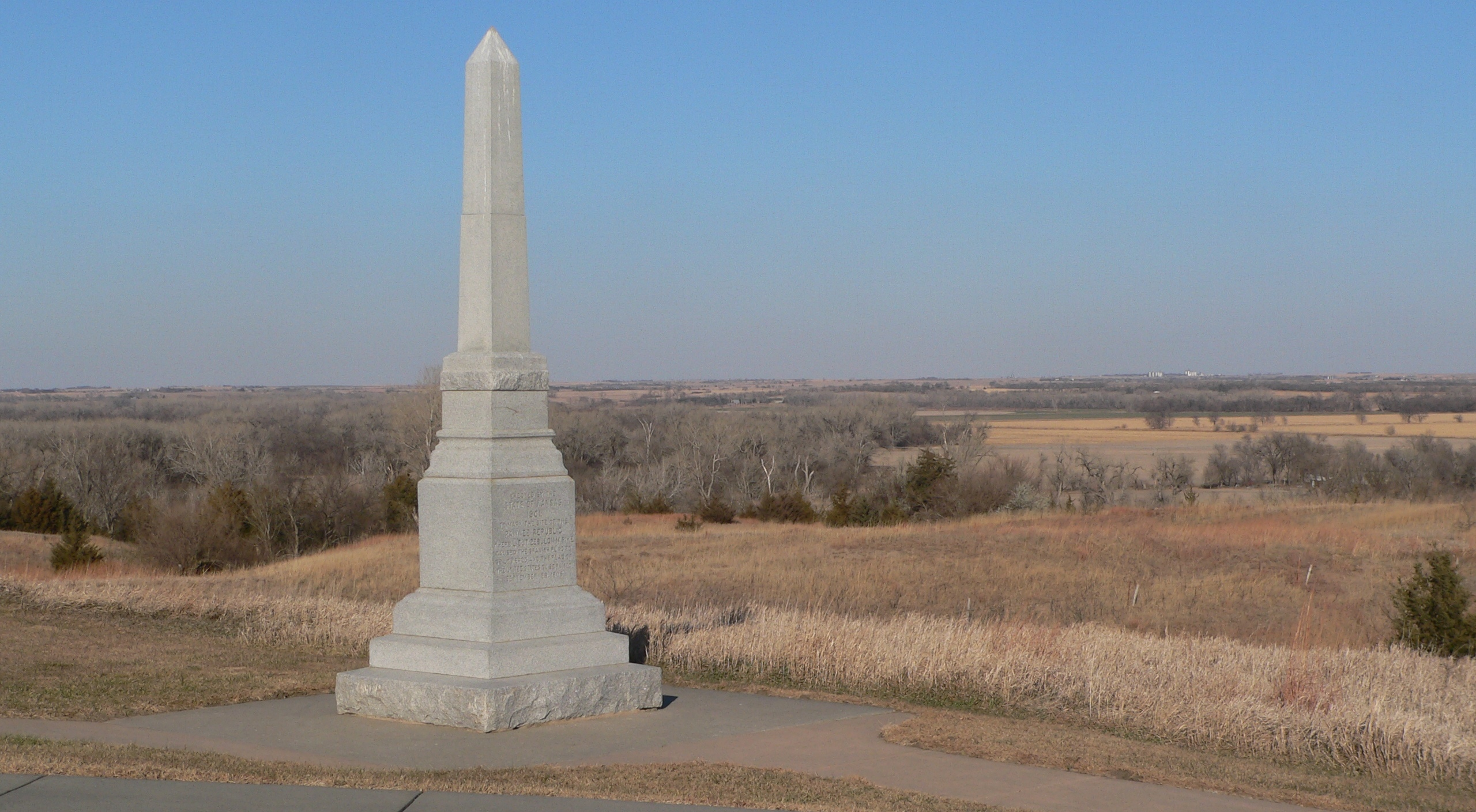
1901 monument at Republic County Pawnee site

In 1806, a party led by Zebulon Pike had visited a Pawnee village on the Republican River shortly after the departure of a much larger Spanish expedition. At the village, Pike had persuaded the Pawnee chief to lower a Spanish flag and to raise that of the United States.

The site of the Pike flag incident was thought to be the Pawnee Indian Village Site near Republic, Kansas. In 1901, the state of Kansas erected a monument on the site; in 1906, a four-day celebration was held to commemorate the centennial of the occurrence.

Hill was one of those who attended the 1906 celebration. Intrigued, he read Pike's journal and the publications of the Kansas and Nebraska historical societies concerning Pike's expedition. From Pike's account of his route, and from a study of the topography of the area, he concluded that the Kansas monument was at the wrong site, and that the Pike flag event must have taken place somewhere in the vicinity of present-day Red Cloud, Nebraska.

The Hills' general store failed, and Hill had to seek work elsewhere. He was hired by an automobile dealer in Fairbury, Nebraska, where he and his family moved in about 1910. When that dealer went out of business in 1912, Hill moved to Hastings, Nebraska, where he went to work selling cars for the A. H. Jones Company; later, he became the company's wholesale manager. His work took him throughout the area in which he thought that the missing Pawnee village must be located, and he took advantage of his business travel to search for artifacts and to query local residents for clues as to its location.

In 1923, he learned of a site near Guide Rock in Webster County, Nebraska, at which Spanish artifacts had been discovered. The owner, the son of the original homesteader, told him that when the ground was first plowed, it was covered with Native American artifacts. Over the next year and a half, Hill excavated at the site, discovering additional Spanish material and other evidence that there had been an important Pawnee village there. He also compared the local topography to Pike's account, and attempted to follow Pike's route to and from the site. All of this persuaded him that he had found the true village that Pike had visited.

In 1925, to protect the site and to make it available for archaeological investigation, Hill bought the two farms that covered it, totalling 320 acres (130 ha). Through 1930, he continued his investigations at the site. Today, there is a strong consensus among archaeologists that Hill correctly identified the Pike village.

== Strong and Wedel ==
In 1929, William Duncan Strong joined the University of Nebraska faculty as a professor of anthropology. In the following year, he began fieldwork along the Republican River in southern Nebraska, assisted by graduate student Waldo Wedel. Hill made contact with the party and, once he was convinced that they were serious students of the past and not mere relic-hunters, invited them to his property in Webster County. Strong's University of Nebraska Archaeological Survey spent two weeks excavating at the site; after the excavation was done, Wedel continued to study the artifacts that they had recovered. This was the first application of Strong's direct historical approach to Central Plains archaeology; in 1936, Wedel published his 1930 master's thesis as the seminal An Introduction to Pawnee Archeology.

Hill did not limit his investigations to the Pike village. In the course of searching for it, he had discovered archaeological sites throughout much of Nebraska and Kansas; and he continued to seek new sites as he travelled through the area. To augment his own efforts, he recruited his salesmen to scout for him. Although he did not give them their present names, he recognized the existence of distinct indigenous cultures in the region: the Woodland, Upper Republican, Lower Loup, and Pawnee complexes.

In the mid-1930s, Hill, Wedel, and Strong found archaeological evidence in Nebraska of a previously unknown prehistoric culture, different from the Central Plains and Woodland traditions. The new culture was named the Dismal River culture, or Dismal River aspect, for its location in the Dismal River basin of Nebraska. It is dated at 1650–1750 A.D.

== Nebraska State Historical Society ==
In 1933, Hill retired from the automobile dealership and moved from Hastings to Lincoln. In that year, the Nebraska State Historical Society named him Director of the Museum and Field Archeology.

Hill proved a great asset to the Society. At a time when the Great Depression had forced deep budget cuts, he was able to work without a salary and to finance excavations out of his own pocket. With his managerial ability and business acumen, he was able to secure federal funds to hire archaeological crews of unemployed persons, and to organize and direct the crews efficiently in the field. From 1933 until 1941, when the United States' entry into World War II put a halt to it, he oversaw extensive excavation projects in Nebraska and Kansas.

During the war, Hill concentrated on the museum, and on the study of material collected in previous years. He managed the conversion of the museum from a library and research institution to one with popular appeal, and contributed his "unsurpassed" collection of Pawnee artifacts to it.

With the conclusion of the war, Hill was eager to return to field work. In 1947, he led a NSHS crew to Frontier County, Nebraska, where sites in the basin of Medicine Creek were threatened by the construction of the Medicine Creek Reservoir. However, failing health forced him to retire in 1949.

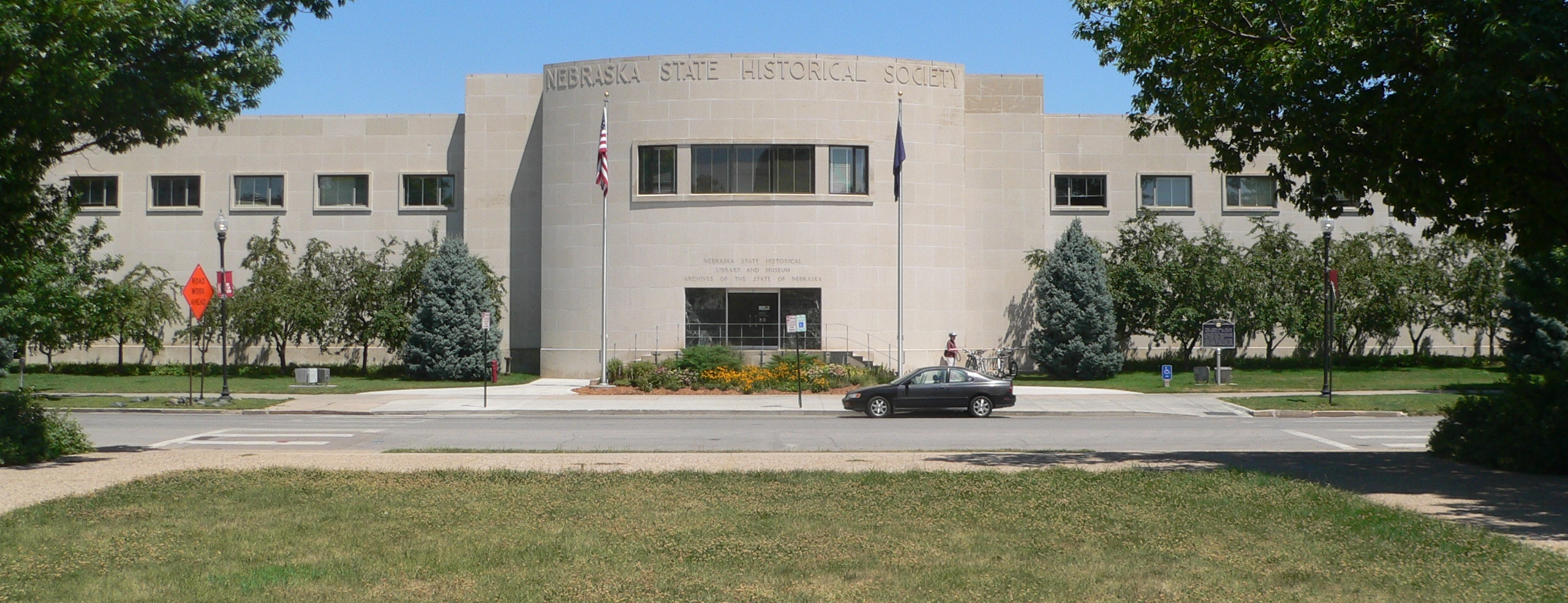
Nebraska State Historical Society building, constructed in 1953

Hill died in Los Angeles in 1953.

== Recognition ==
According to Wedel, Hill had an "aversion to setting down in print what he had seen or inferred", which kept his contributions to the field from being recognized by the larger archaeological community.

The Pike-Pawnee Village Site, where Pike's flag incident took place, is also known as the Hill Farm Site.

In 1948, the University of Nebraska gave Hill its "Nebraska Builder" award, citing him as the "father of systematic archeology in Nebraska".

In 1975, the Nebraska State Historical Society Foundation established its Asa T. Hill Award for notable archaeological work in Nebraska or the Great Plains. Recipients have included professional and amateur archaeologists.
