= Pike-Pawnee Village Site =

- U.S. National Register of Historic Places
- U.S. National Historic Landmark
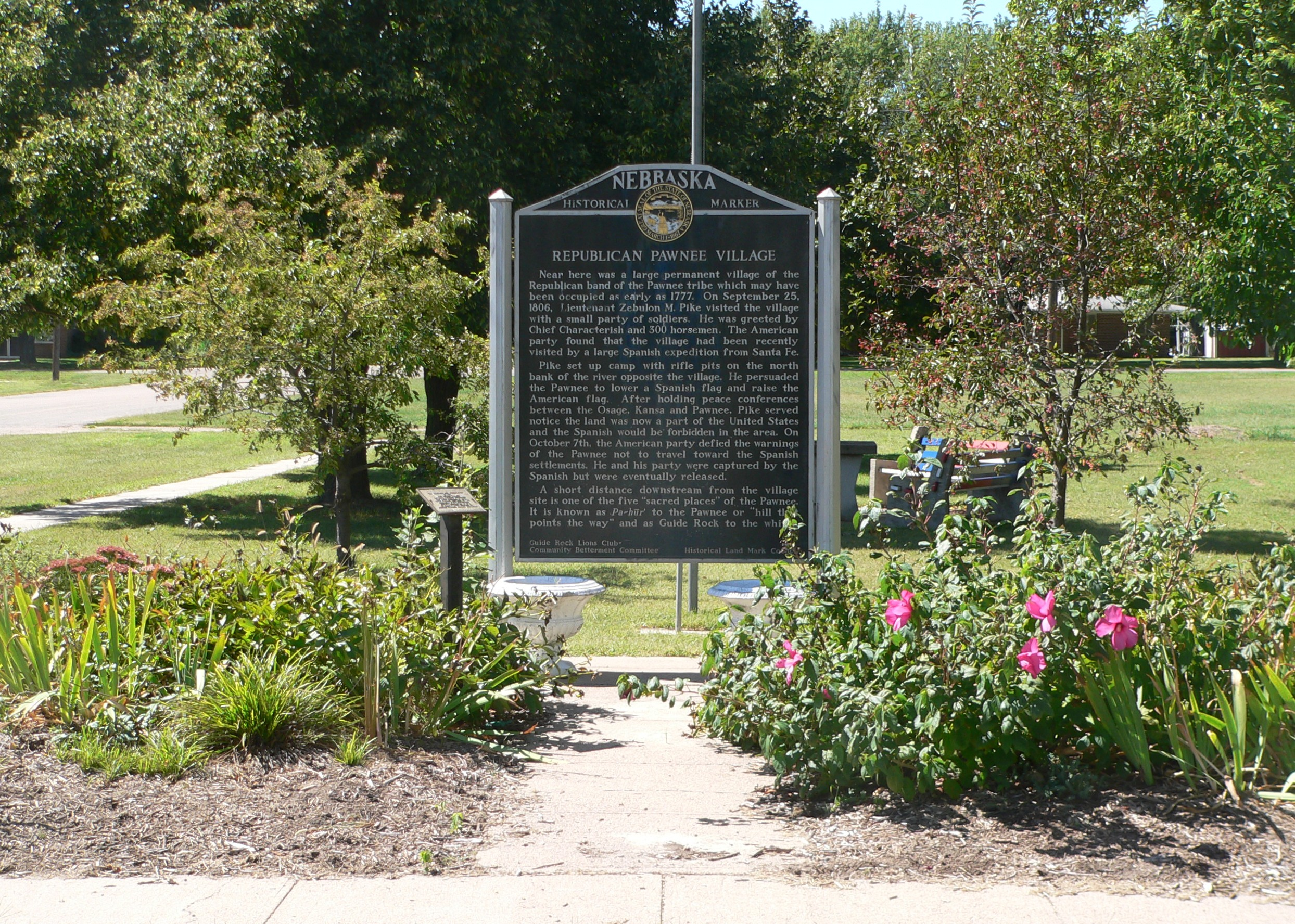
- Historical marker in Guide Rock commemorating the village and Pike's visit

- Webster County, Nebraska
- Nearest city: Guide Rock, Nebraska
- Area: ca. 300 acres (120 ha)
- NRHP reference No.: 66000455

Significant dates
- Added to NRHP: October 15, 1966
- Designated NHL: July 19, 1964

The Pike-Pawnee Village Site, or Hill Farm Site, designated 25WT1 by archaeologists, is a site near the village of Guide Rock in Webster County, in the south central portion of the state of Nebraska, in the Great Plains region of the United States. It was the location of a village of the Kitkehahki band of the Pawnee people, in a region of the Republican River valley that they occupied intermittently from the 1770s to the 1820s.

In 1806, the village was visited by a Spanish expedition led by Lieutenant Facundo Melgares and, soon after, by an American expedition led by Lieutenant Zebulon Pike. At the village, Pike persuaded the Pawnee leaders to haul down a Spanish flag that they had received from Melgares, and to raise the flag of the United States in its stead.

The location of the village visited by Pike was not known for many years. In the early 20th century, two sites were proposed: this one in Nebraska, and one in Republic County in northern Kansas. A dispute between the historical societies of the two states ensued, titled "The War Between Nebraska and Kansas". The dispute was eventually resolved in favor of the Nebraska site.

Investigations conducted at the site by William Duncan Strong, Waldo Wedel, and A. T. Hill were instrumental in the development of Great Plains archaeology, and of Pawnee archaeology in particular.

The site is a National Historic Landmark, and is listed in the National Register of Historic Places.

== Description ==
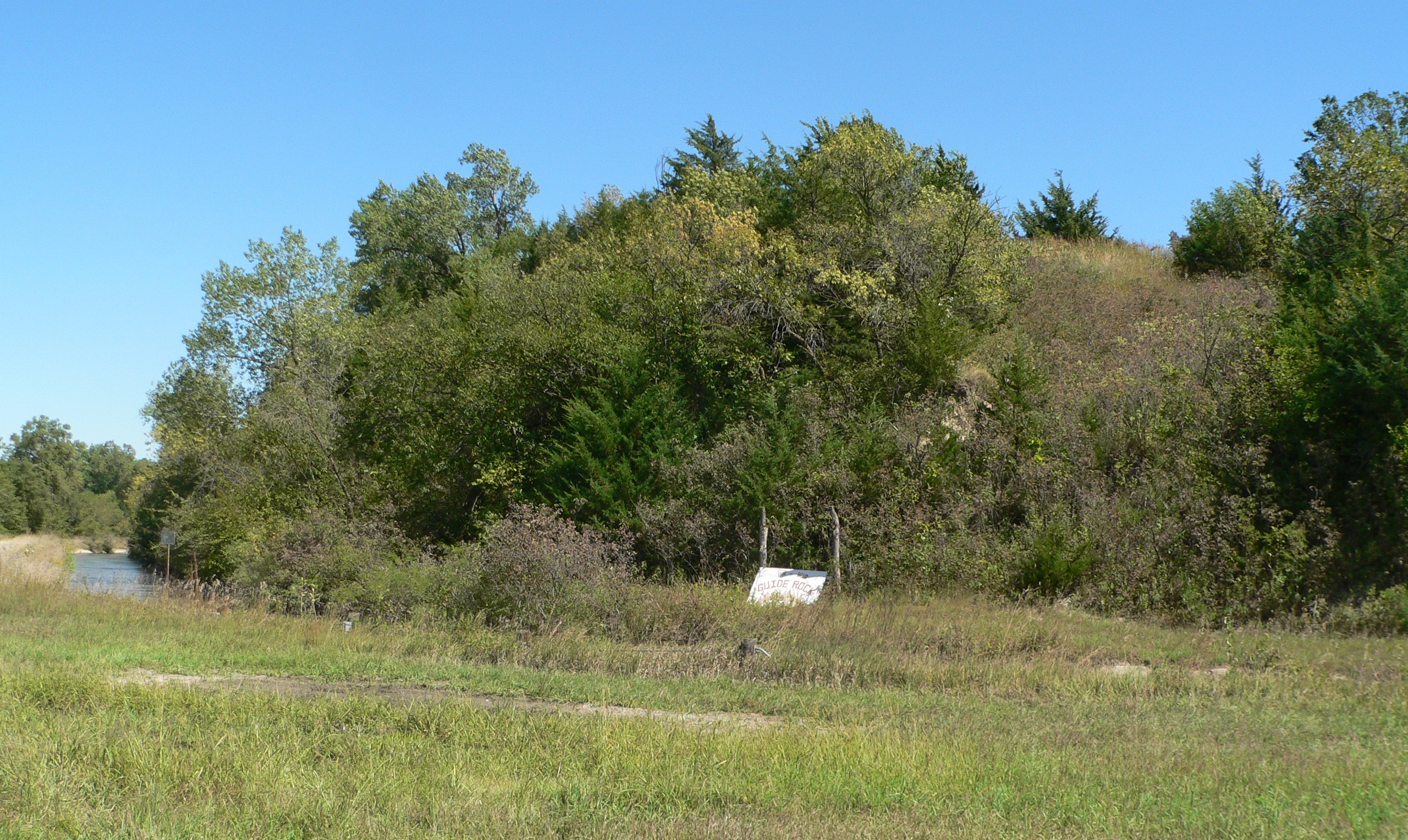
Pa-hur in 2010

The site lies on a terrace on the Republican River's south side, near the village of Guide Rock. At the terrace's north edge is a near-vertical 25–30-foot (8–9 m) bank; the floodplain of the river extends about one-fourth mile (about one-half kilometer) from the bank's base to the present channel. The remains of over 100 earth lodges lie on the terrace between the bank and hills to the south, which rise 125 feet (38 m) above the site. On the hills are five cemeteries. The village complex also includes a council site and two open courts where a hoop game was played.

The village extended for at least 1,200 feet (370 m) from east to west. On its east and west sides were creeks, now dry, that ran northward into the Republican. At the time of the village's occupation, springs in the western creek flowed year-round; these would have provided a more convenient source of water than the river, since access to the latter was hampered by the steep bank. The springs ceased to flow at some time after the land came under cultivation in the 1870s.

Not far downstream from the site is a hill known to the Pawnees as Pa-hur, or "hill that points the way". In the traditional Pawnee religion, this was one of five lodges of the nahurac, spirit animals with supernatural healing powers.

== History 1770–1806 ==
=== The Southern Pawnees move north ===
The ancestors of the modern Pawnee people were not a single unified tribe. At the middle of the 18th century, they consisted of two major groups. The Skidis, or Wolf Pawnees, had migrated northward with the Arikaras, and had probably been in Nebraska since 1600 or earlier. By the beginning of the 18th century, they were established on the Loup River, which flows through central Nebraska into the Platte River from the north. The second major division of the ancestral Pawnees was the Southern, or Black Pawnees. Their migration history is not well documented; but by 1750 they, with the related and allied Wichitas, had established what seemed to be a secure territory on the Arkansas River.

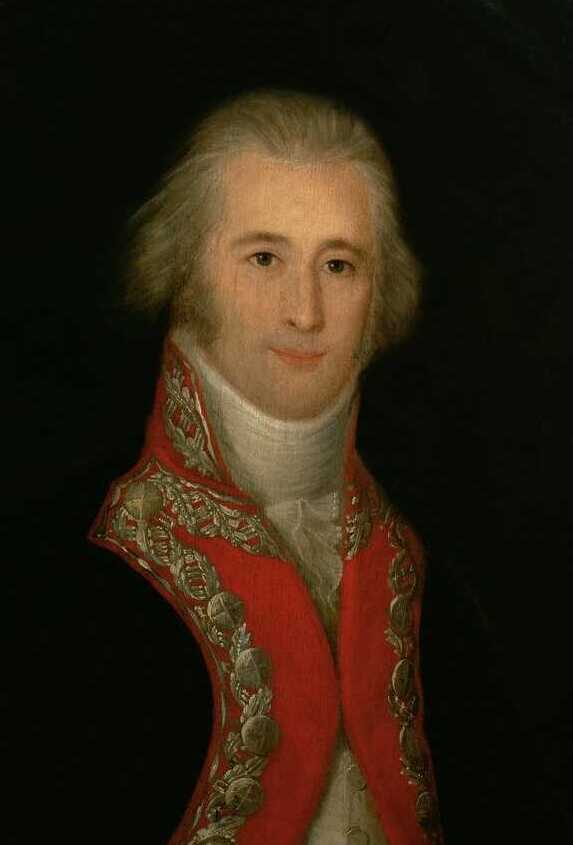
Alejandro O'Reilly

The security of the southern bands depended on French trade in arms, and this was disrupted by the French and Indian War (1754–63). In 1763, France surrendered the Louisiana Territory under the terms of the Treaty of Fontainebleau. Great Britain obtained the portion of the territory east of the Mississippi River. Spain received the territory west of the Mississippi, including New Orleans, although they did not make their claim to that city effective until Alejandro O'Reilly suppressed the Louisiana Rebellion of 1768. Once in control of New Orleans, the Spanish imposed severe restrictions on trade up the Mississippi, cutting off the supply of arms to the Southern Pawnees and Wichitas.

The neighboring Osages were not so affected, as they had access to arms smuggled by French traders from British territory in present-day Illinois. With superior weaponry, they drove between the Southern Pawnees and the Wichitas, pushing the latter group southward to the Red River. The Pawnees moved northward into Nebraska, possibly because of news that modern weapons were available from traders on the Platte.

The dates of the moves are not known exactly. The Wichita move from the Arkansas to the Red occurred at some time between 1768 and 1772. The Osages occupied the former Pawnee-Wichita hunting grounds on the Arkansas in 1774, indicating that the Pawnees had left by then; in 1777, a Spanish report indicated that they were in Nebraska. The Southern Pawnees were divided into three bands: the Chauis, or Grand Pawnees; the Pitahawiratas, or Tappage Pawnees; and the Kitkehahkis, or Republican Pawnees. The Chauis were regarded as the nominal leaders, and in the traditional account they led the migration to Nebraska, followed by the Pitahawiratas. However, the Kitkehahkis declined to follow the Chaui chiefs to their new settlements on the Platte; instead, they established themselves on the Republican River, near what is now the Nebraska-Kansas border.

=== Occupation history ===
There is much debate among historians and archaeologists concerning the dates of occupation of the Webster County village. Four Kitkehahki village sites on the Republican are known, two of them quite large: this one, and the Pawnee Indian Village Site near Republic, Kansas, 49 kilometres (30 mi) downstream. The band inhabited the Republican valley intermittently from the 1770s to the 1820s. Unfortunately, there is little information on which villages were occupied at what times, although there is a strong consensus that this village is the one visited by Pike in 1806. The following account, therefore, can only describe what is known about Kitkehahki occupation and abandonment of the Republican valley, and not the history of this particular village.

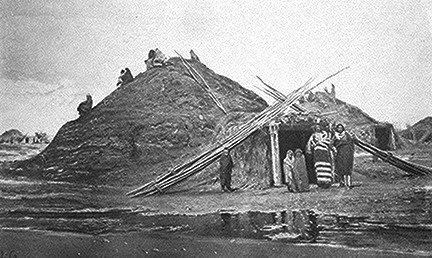
Pawnee earth lodge in Nebraska, 1873

The Pawnees did not live in their villages year-round. In the spring, they planted and hoed crops near their villages. In mid-June, they left on their summer buffalo hunt. In September, they returned to harvest the crops and to hold their harvest festival; they then cached a portion of their food in their villages and left on the winter buffalo hunt, from which they did not return until planting time in the spring. Thus the villages were deserted for at least eight months of the year.

The Kitkehahkis also moved, both in small groups and en masse, between the Republican and the Platte. The Pitahawiratas and the Chauis seem to have lived together amicably from the time of their arrival in Nebraska. However, the Kitkehahkis were divided between those who wanted to live independently on the Republican, and those who wanted to live near the Chauis on the Platte. The three bands frequently moved together on the summer and winter buffalo hunts, so there was regular contact between them. It was common for people to move from one household to another, especially upon returning from a buffalo hunt; this would have facilitated moves from village to village.

At times, the entire Kitkehahki band abandoned the Republican and moved to the Platte. Generally, this took place in times of war, when the bands sought protection in numbers. Movement between the Republican and the Platte probably occurred continually until about 1825.

=== War with the Skidis ===
When the Southern Pawnees arrived in Nebraska, the Skidis were not pleased to see them on lands that they regarded as their own. Nevertheless, they were willing to accept them as neighbors, so long as they kept to the south side of the Platte. However, the Chaui leaders demanded that they be recognized as the heads of the entire Pawnee people, above the Skidi chiefs. They defied the Skidis by sending a large hunting party to Prairie Creek, on the north side of the Platte within sight of the Skidi villages on the Loup. The Skidis responded by attacking the Chaui hunters and driving them back across the Platte. The Chauis and Pitahawiratas resolved on war, and summoned the Kitkehahki fighters to join them against the Skidis; the Kitkehahkis, unwilling to leave their people unprotected against Skidi raids, left the Republican and moved to the Platte near the other bands.

The conflict with the Skidis probably took place sometime between 1770 and 1775. It concluded with the defeat of the Skidis, who, although nominally conquered, remained on the Loup and continued to hunt separately from the other three bands. By 1777, the Kitkehahkis had moved back to the Republican.

At some time between 1777 and 1785, the Kitkehahkis again abandoned and then re-occupied the Republican valley. A Spanish account of 1785 describes a village on the south side of the Platte in Butler County, not far from the modern town of Linwood, Nebraska; this village was occupied by the Kitkehahkis until about 1785, when they returned to the Republican.

=== War with the Omahas ===
War came to the Kitkehahkis on the Republican in 1798. The Omahas, under the leadership of Chief Blackbird, had become perhaps the most powerful group in Nebraska. They were located at the junction of the French trade route up the Missouri River and an overland route across northern Iowa whereby the Sac and Fox brought British arms and goods westward. This allowed them to levy tribute and exercise control over trade on the Missouri.

During the height of their power in the late 1790s, bands of Omaha warriors frequently visited the Kitkehahkis to perform the calumet ceremony. This traditional peacemaking ritual had degenerated into what the Omahas called "smoking for horses": the Kitkehahkis were obliged to give feasts and presents of horses to their uninvited guests. In 1798, a group of Omahas under Little Grizzly Bear went for this purpose to the Republican. The Kitkehahkis, feeling imposed upon by the frequency of these visits, stripped and beat the Omahas and drove them out of the village.

When Blackbird learned of this, he ordered an attack on the Kitkehahkis. The Omahas descended upon the band's village, burned and plundered many of the lodges, and killed about one hundred Pawnees at the cost of about fifteen of their own men. The remaining Kitkehahkis had withdrawn into four lodges, occupying a position too strong for the Omahas to reach them and massacre them without unacceptable losses.

Whether the Republican valley was abandoned after the Omaha attack is not recorded. The invading Omahas had camped on the Platte, undisturbed by the Chauis, on their way to the Kitkehahkis; this might indicate that the two Pawnee bands were on bad terms at the time. The power of the Omahas was broken soon thereafter: in about 1801, a smallpox epidemic spread from the Skidis to the Omahas, killing half of the tribe, Blackbird among them.

When the Lewis and Clark Expedition reached the Platte in 1804, they found the Kitkehahkis (whom they mistakenly called Arapahos) living there. They were told that the band had returned to the Republican about ten years before (that is, before the conflict with the Omahas), but had recently moved to the Platte under pressure from the Kanzas. By 1806, however, the Kitkehahkis were at peace with the Kanzas, and were once again living on the Republican.

== 1806: Melgares and Pike ==
Under the 1800 Treaty of San Ildefonso, Spain returned the Louisiana Territory to France. In connection with this transfer, France agreed not to sell the territory to a third party; French foreign minister Talleyrand had indicated that a strong French Louisiana would halt the expansion of Britain and the United States in the New World.

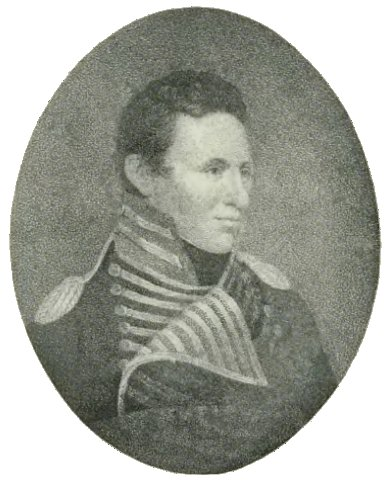
Zebulon Pike

Napoleon quickly reneged on this agreement. In the 1803 Louisiana Purchase, France sold the territory to the United States. This led to conflict between the latter nation and Spain. The Spanish contended that the sale of Louisiana to the United States was invalid, and that the territory had reverted to them. Although they were unable to prevent American occupation of New Orleans, they sought to check American activity west of the Mississippi River.

Spain and the United States both sought allies among the Native Americans of the disputed territory. In June 1806, Lieutenant Facundo Melgares and 600 men were dispatched from the Spanish provincial capital of Santa Fe down the Red River and then northward into present-day Nebraska. Although no Spanish records of the Melgares expedition are known to exist, it is believed that its purpose was to find and arrest the Lewis and Clark party, and to establish alliances with the Native Americans of the region, including the Pawnees.

About a month later, Lieutenant Zebulon Pike left St. Louis with an American party of 23 men, and orders to negotiate peace between the Kanzas and Osages, to contact the Comanches of the high plains, and to explore the headwaters of the Red and Arkansas Rivers. For guides and interpreters to the Comanches, Pike turned to the Pawnees; his Osage and Pawnee guides led him northwest through present-day Kansas toward the Kitkehahki village on the Republican.

Melgares was the first to arrive at the village. His journey north had not been easy. Mutiny had broken out and been suppressed among his New Mexican militia; and many of his horses had gone lame, or had been stolen by Pawnee raiders. He had left 240 of his men on the Arkansas in southern Kansas before turning northward with the other half of his force. In the Republican village, he met with Kitkehahki and Chaui leaders, to whom he presented gifts, including Spanish flags. The Pawnees agreed to expel Americans from their territory, but also opposed the Melgares expedition's continuing to the Missouri River. In the face of this opposition, and with no supply lines and a force too large to live off the country, Melgares returned to the Arkansas and thence to Santa Fe.

=== Pike at the village ===
Pike's party reached the Kitkehahki village on September 25, 1806, shortly after Melgares's departure. Upon his arrival, he was greeted by the ranking chief, Sharitarish, who invited him to eat in his lodge and told him of Melgares's recent visit. The Pawnees presented eight horses to the Osages accompanying Pike, and members of the two tribes smoked pipes together. Pike's party established a camp fortified with rifle pits on a hill on the north bank of the Republican opposite the village.

On the following day, a delegation of 12 Kanzas arrived at the village; on September 28, they held a council with the Osages. Pipes were smoked in token of peace between the tribes.

On September 29, Pike held a "grand council" with the Pawnees. At this council, one of Melgares's Spanish flags was displayed at the chief's lodge. Pike urged the Pawnees to haul it down and replace it with that of the United States. When the Pawnee chiefs demurred,

... I again reiterated the demand for the flag, adding "that it was impossible for the nation to have two fathers; that they must either be the children of the Spaniards, or acknowledge their American father". After a silence of some time an old man rose, went to the door, took down the Spanish flag, brought it and laid it at my feet; he then received the American flag, and elevated it on the staff which had lately borne the standard of his Catholic Majesty.

This was favorably received by the Osages and Kanzas, but apparently caused distress to the Pawnees. Perceiving this, Pike returned the Spanish flag to them, asking only that they not fly it during his party's stay in the village. "At this, there was a general shout of applause ..."

Pike had planned for the Pawnees to guide him to the Comanches. However, upon his arrival at the village, he was informed that the two tribes were at war. When Pike expressed his intention of continuing inland toward the headwaters of the Arkansas, Sharitarish urged him to turn back: he had prevented the Spanish from going further into American territory, and would likewise resist an American movement toward Spanish land.

Pike refused to be intimidated. He told the chief

... that the young warriors of his great American father were not women, to be turned back by words; that I should therefore proceed, and if he thought proper to stop me, he could attempt it; but that we were men, well armed, and would sell our lives at a dear rate to his nation; that we knew our great father would send his young warriors there to gather our bones and revenge our deaths on his people ...

The Pawnees relented, though unwillingly and with much dissent. Pike obtained horses from them, and set out on October 7. He ordered his party to stay in a compact body, with guns and bayonets and sabers at the ready; he estimated that "it would have cost them at least 100 men to have exterminated us". With no guides to the Comanches, he was forced to abandon that part of the mission; instead, he returned south into Kansas, where he attempted to follow Melgares's trail toward the Arkansas.

== 1806–1833 ==
Sharitarish was a Chaui who, at some time before 1805, had been involved in a struggle over the leadership of that band. In the course of this struggle, he had brought his clan to the Kitkehahki village on the Republican, where he had deposed Iskatappe, the hereditary chief of the Kitkehahki. Although the exact situation is not known, it is thought that Sharitarish was trying to bring the Kitkehahkis back to the Platte, to support his faction in the Chaui village.

After 1806, the Spanish continued their efforts to win the friendship of the Pawnees. Messages were dispatched to the Pawnee chiefs, urging them to come to Santa Fe; and most of these messages went to Sharitarish. The fact that he received them while Long Hair, the Chaui head chief, was ignored, fed his self-importance. In 1809, in an ill-judged attempt to impress the Pawnees, he led the Kitkehahki to war with the Kanzas. By 1811 he had been defeated, and the Kitkehahkis had been forced to abandon the Republican and move to the Platte.

There is no firm documentary evidence of occupation of the Webster County village after 1809. However, analysis of pottery and glass beads suggests that the site was re-occupied during the second decade of the 19th century; and three letters from 1823 and 1825 suggest that the Kitkehahki were living on the Republican. By 1833, however, the village had been abandoned and the band was living on the Loup River. In that year, the four Pawnee bands, treated as a single tribe by the U.S. government, signed a treaty in which they gave up their lands south of the Platte.

== Rediscovering the village ==
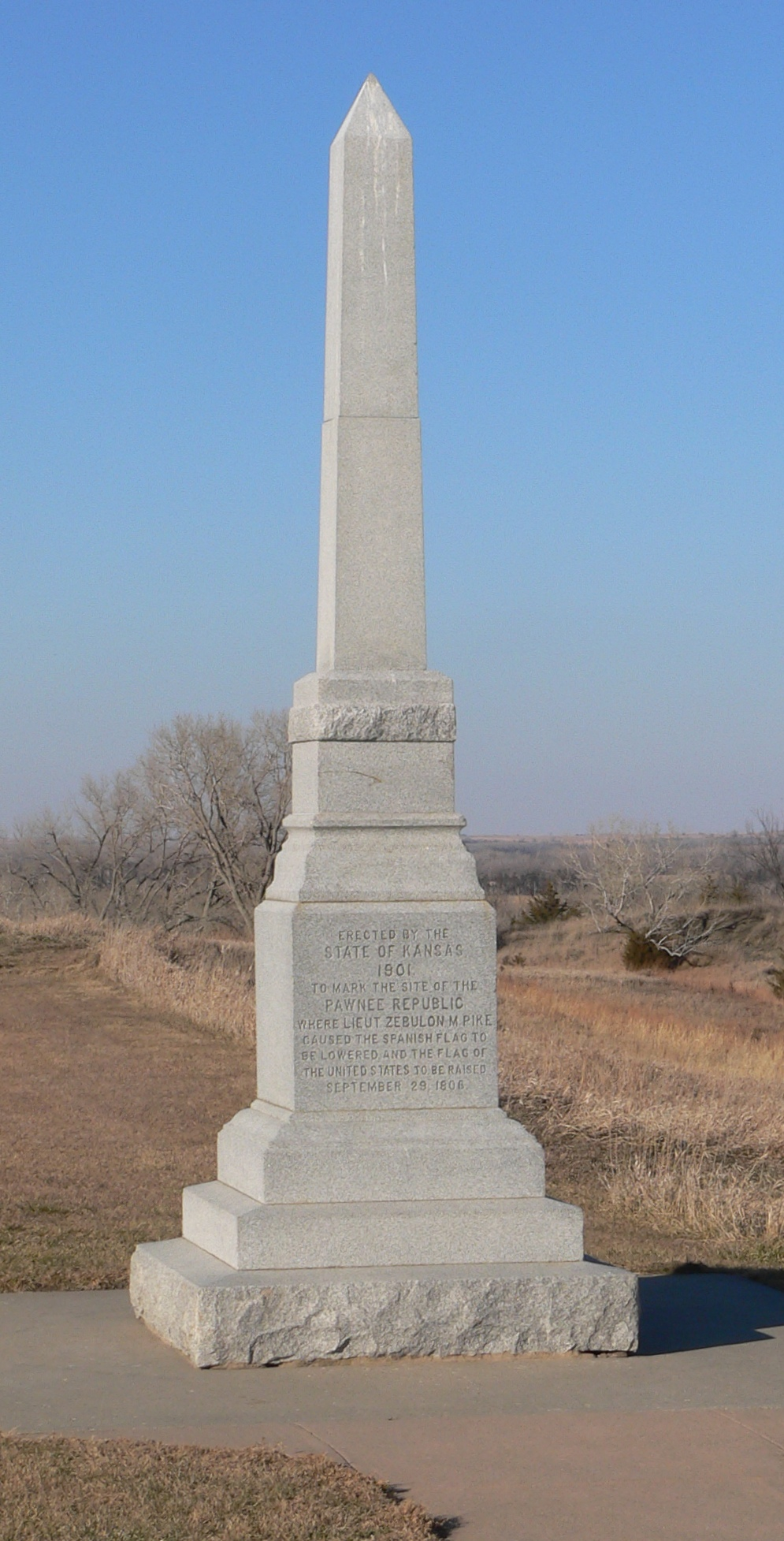
1901 monument at Republic County site. The monument was damaged by a tornado in 2004 and has been restored, though not to its original size and appearance.

Webster County was opened to homesteaders in 1870. In 1872, the village site was homesteaded and placed under cultivation.

In 1875, Elizabeth Johnson discovered the remains of a Pawnee village in Republic County, Kansas. She thought that it might be the site of Pike's flag incident; but hearing of another village in Webster County, Nebraska, she dispatched her husband and another man to investigate this site. Because the surface had been altered by cultivation, they found little evidence of habitation, and Johnson was persuaded that the Republic County site was Pike's village. She prevented its being plowed on several occasions, and eventually purchased the land.

Johnson's claim was supported by Elliott Coues, who had edited Pike's journal; with his endorsement, it was accepted by the Kansas State Historical Society. In 1901, Johnson donated the land to the state of Kansas, which built a 26-foot (7.9 m) granite monument commemorating Pike's symbolic triumph over Spain. At the dedication of the monument, several of the speakers drew parallels between the Pike episode and the recent American victory in the Spanish–American War. In 1906, a four-day festival was held to celebrate the centennial of the flag incident.

=== A. T. Hill ===
One of those attending the 1906 ceremonies at the Kansas monument was A. T. Hill, a resident of Logan, Kansas. Hill had no formal training as an archaeologist—indeed, his formal education had ended in the fourth grade. However, he had developed a strong interest in the history and archaeology of the Great Plains.

Upon reading Pike's journal, Hill became convinced that the Kansas site could not be the correct one. To him, the local topography did not appear to match that described by Pike; and when he attempted to retrace Pike's route, he concluded that the actual village site must be some distance northwest of the Kansas monument.

In 1912, Hill moved to Hastings, Nebraska, where he went to work for an automobile dealership. In his job, he traveled throughout central Nebraska; in the course of this, he spoke with many collectors and investigated possible Pike sites. When he reached a managerial position at the dealership, he recruited his salesmen to bring him reports on archaeological sites and collections.

In 1923, Hill learned of the remains of a Spanish saddle obtained from the George DeWitt farm in Webster County. He visited the farm, and learned from DeWitt, the son of the original homesteader, that when the land was first plowed, it was covered with Native American relics. Hill opened a grave and found a Spanish bridle bit and spur; across the river, on land that had never been plowed, he found traces of a camp, including rifle pits. The topography of the site closely matched Pike's description; and when Hill attempted to follow Pike's route from the site to the Arkansas River, he recognized a number of landmarks from Pike's account.

Hill called the attention of the Nebraska State Historical Society (NSHS) to the site and, in 1924, joined representatives of the Society in conducting further excavations, showing that a village of considerable size had existed there. In 1925, to ensure archaeological access to the site and to protect it from relic-hunting, he bought the two farms on whose land it lay. Between 1924 and 1930, he excavated two lodges and over fifty graves.

=== Nebraska versus Kansas ===
By 1927, Hill and the NSHS were persuaded that the Webster County site was the scene of the Pike flag incident. In that year, they challenged Kansas's claim. A full issue of the Society's journal, Nebraska History, was devoted to the matter. The issue, provocatively titled "The War Between Nebraska and Kansas", included articles by representatives of the Nebraska society and of the Kansas Historical Society, each claiming the Pike site for his own state.

More than historical accuracy was at stake. In a 1901 address delivered at the Republic County site, Katherine S. Lewis of the Kansas Daughters of the American Revolution had declared that "we have been seeking out antiquity for Kansas; we felt that our state was too new to be interesting". In 1927, Kansans still regarded their Pike site as a focus of state pride, and were unwilling to give it up: in the Nebraska History issue, George Morehouse of the KHS wrote, "It is now very strange that ... our Nebraska friends should become so enthusiastic in trying to take from our Pike's Pawnee Republic Village its halo of glory."

In their articles, the champions of each state argued that Pike's account of his route supported their site, and entirely ruled out the other. Both sides also argued that Pike's description of the local topography matched their site and differed significantly from the other.

The proponents of the Nebraska site cited the artifacts that had been recovered from their village. These included a Spanish peace medal dated 1797 and bearing the image of Charles IV, an American peace medal of the type issued after 1801, and soldier's buttons and brass medallions bearing 15 stars, one of which bore the number "1", that of Pike's infantry regiment.

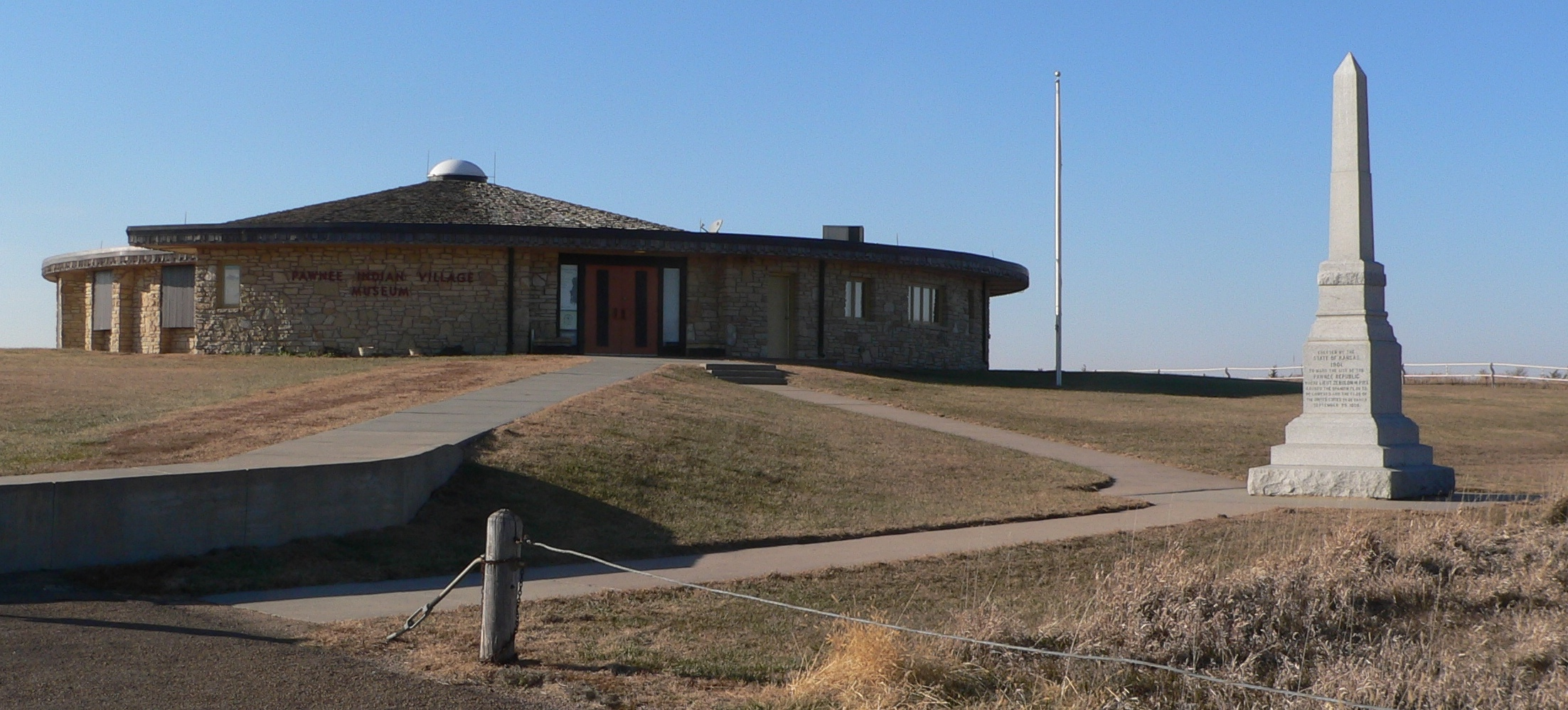
Pawnee Indian Museum and restored 1901 monument at Republic County site

The Kansans had no such artifacts to show. However, they argued that the Nebraska village postdated the Pike episode. The Kansas village, they stated, had been the one visited by Pike, and was occupied by the Pawnees until they were driven north by the Delawares in the early 1830s; the fleeing Pawnees had then established the village on the Republican, where they had been devastated by smallpox. In this account the epidemic, and not long habitation, explained the number of graves found by Hill; the medals had not been buried with their original owners, but had been treasured by the band for decades, until the time that the pestilence was blamed on "evil gifts from the whites" and they were cast away.

Further work at both sites strengthened the case for Nebraska. Kansas supporters gave ground reluctantly: a major celebration was held at the Republic County site in 1933, and as late as 1947, an article in the Kansas Historical Quarterly spoke of the issue as "debatable ground". Today, however, the Webster County site is generally acknowledged as the true one: an exhibit at the Republic County site states as much, and a Kansas historical marker near the 1901 monument states that "the village was long believed ... to be that visited by Zebulon M. Pike".

Although Elizabeth Johnson was mistaken about the Pike village site, her mistake is held to be a fortunate one. The Webster County site had been subjected to decades of cultivation and relic hunting. The Republic County site was not entirely pristine, due to surface collecting and possibly to amateur excavation; but it was far better preserved. Today, the Kansas Historical Society operates a museum on the site, built in 1967 over one of the excavated earth lodges.

== Investigation history ==
Hill continued work at the site through 1930. In that year, he was joined by William Duncan Strong, who the previous year had been named a professor of anthropology at the University of Nebraska, and by Strong's research assistant Waldo Wedel. The collaboration of these three was crucial to the new science of Central Plains archaeology, and to Pawnee studies in particular: up to this time, the conventional wisdom among anthropologists was that there was no useful archaeological work to be done on the Plains. In 1936, Wedel published his 1930 master's thesis as the seminal An Introduction to Pawnee Archaeology.

In the summer of 1941, a WPA crew excavated a number of lodges, cache pits, and graves at the site. Some testing and surface collecting were conducted in 1943. More recently, a magnetic survey was conducted over a portion of the village in 1982, and some testing was carried out in 1987.

Hill plotted the remains of 102 lodges. Pike reported finding 44 lodges at the village; the difference is probably due to the abandonment or destruction of lodges and the building of new ones on different sites. At least 90 graves have been investigated by archaeologists; an estimated 75–100 additional graves are thought to have been opened by relic hunters.

== Preservation ==
In 1964, the site was listed as a National Historic Landmark. In 1966, it was added to the National Register of Historic Places. The boundaries of the historic site were expanded to nearly 300 acres (120 ha) at some time in 1977 or later.

The site is owned and preserved by the Nebraska State Historical Society Foundation. There is no museum or visitor center there, and the site is not open to the public.
