= Waldo Rudolph Wedel =

American archaeologist

Waldo Wedel
- Born: September 10, 1908; Newton, Kansas, U.S.
- Died: August 27, 1996 (aged 87); Boulder, Colorado, U.S.
- Education: University of California, Berkeley
- Known for: Direct historical approach to archaeology
- Spouse: Mildred Mott Wedel
- Children: 3
- Scientific career
- Fields: Archaeology
- Workplaces: Smithsonian Institution
- Doctoral advisor: Carl Sauer

Waldo Rudolph Wedel (September 10, 1908 – August 27, 1996) was an American archaeologist and a central figure in the study of the prehistory of the Great Plains. He was born in Newton, Kansas to a family of Mennonites.

In 1939 he married Mildred Mott, a fellow archaeologist and ethnohistorian. Wedel died in 1996 in Boulder, Colorado, about one year after Mildred's death.

== Education ==
Wedel began studying at Bethel College in Newton, Kansas. In 1928, he transferred to the University of Arizona to study under archaeologist Byron Cummings and visiting professor William Morris Davis. In 1930 he received his BA from the University of Arizona. He then transferred to the University of Nebraska for a M.A. degree and studied under William Duncan Strong. In 1931 Wedel received his M.A. degree. His thesis utilized Strong's direct historical approach to studying Pawnee archaeological materials. During the next four field seasons he was involved with excavations under the University of Nebraska and the Nebraska State Historical Society. In 1934, he published his first report on the Medicine Creek site, under Nebraska State Historical Society archaeologist A. T. Hill.

In 1932 Wedel went to the University of California, Berkeley for his Ph.D. He studied under Strong's mentor Alfred L. Kroeber. While at Berkeley, Kroeber steered Wedel into conducting ethnographic research with the Comanche. Wedel's interest at the time, however, was leaning toward studying the effects that climate had on prehistoric populations. He was influenced by the fact that the Dust Bowl was occurring in the Midwest. In particular, he was interested in studying the effects of similar droughts on prehistoric people. Kroeber discouraged this subject, so Wedel pursued his interests under geographer Carl Sauer. In 1936 Wedel was the first person to receive a Ph.D. in anthropology with a specialization in archaeology from Berkeley.

== Career ==
After receiving his Ph.D., Wedel moved back to Nebraska and worked as an archaeologist for the Nebraska State Historical Society for one field season. In August 1936, he began his career with the Smithsonian Institution. His original position was Assistant Curator of Archaeology. Over the next 29 years, Wedel held numerous positions at the Smithsonian until his ultimate position of Senior Archaeologist. In 1976 Wedel retired from the Smithsonian but continued to remain active in research as Archaeologist Emeritus for the Institution.

In the 1930s, Wedel, William Duncan Strong and A. T. Hill found archaeological evidence in Nebraska different from that of the prehistoric Central Plains and Woodland traditions. The evidence was attributed to a new culture called the Dismal River culture, or Dismal River aspect, for its location on the Dismal River basin, dated between 1650 and 1750 A.D.

Among the positions that Wedel held was that of field director and party chief for the Smithsonian Missouri River Basin Surveys Project. The Missouri Basin Project was a separate division of the Smithsonian that existed for nearly 24 years beginning in 1946. The goal of the project was to survey the roughly 500,000 square miles (1,300,000 km^{2}) of the Missouri River Basin for archaeological remains that were to be affected by the construction of federal reservoirs. Although the project was technically a division of the Smithsonian, it was funded by a cooperative agreement between federal agencies such as the Bureau of Reclamation and the Army Corps of Engineers. During its time, the Interagency Archeological Salvage Program accomplished more archaeological recovery than any other river basin in the nation. The River Basin Project was eventually transferred to the National Park Service and led to the development of the Midwest Archeological Center.

Wedel remains a key figure in archaeological studies. Because he never held an academic position he is important for shaping the image of the professional federal archaeologist. He has been referred to as "the professor without a classroom".

== Influences on archaeology ==
Wedel was influential to the study of prehistory for numerous reasons. Due to his experience with the Missouri Basin Project he developed a chronology of the Great Plains prehistoric cultural groups. One of his most used publications was Prehistoric Man on the Great Plains, which was widely read by both professional and amateur archaeologists.

Wedel has also been cited as a central figure in the utilization of the direct historical approach for archaeology. This approach in archaeology focused on identifying cultural links between modern native groups with complexes found in the material record. Wedel explains his project: "Here the task becomes one of linking the archaeological record with the documentary, of correlating late material culture complexes with the various tribal units known or thought to have inhabited certain localities". This tool for archaeologists has become especially important in recent times as a result of the effect of the Native American Graves Protection and Repatriation Act, which requires the identification of cultural affinity for repatriation of remains.

Wedel undoubtedly influenced archaeological theory due to his focus on Plains ecology and human history. In "Primitive Man in the Boulder Area" Wedel discussed the need to study archaeological materials from a multidisciplinary approach. He cited archaeology, geology, climatology, and biology as useful disciplines for explaining the past in a more comprehensive and insightful manor than typically practiced. He also was a long advocate for the use of the scientific method in archaeology, stating:

…I hold that, whatever its ultimate goal, archaeology can progress surely only as its practitioners adhere to the method and attitude of science – in essence, the acceptance of observed and verifiable facts, the eschewing of unsupported speculations and personal dicta, and a circumspect tolerance of that for which the observational, experimental, or experiential evidence is not immediately at hand.

These two views were inspiring to the direction that the new processual archaeology began to take in the 1960s.

== Awards ==
- 1991 Plains Anthropological Society—first Distinguished Service Award to Waldo and Mildred Mott Wedel
- 1986 Society for American Archaeology—Distinguished Service Award
- 1985 Kansas State University—Honorary Sc.D. degree
- 1972 University of Nebraska—Honorary Sc.D. degree
- 1971 Bethel College—Distinguished Alumnus Award
- 1965 Elected to the U.S. National Academy of Sciences
- 1947 Washington Academy of Sciences—Award for Distinguished Service in Biological Sciences
