= Dismal River culture =

Native American culture in the Great Plains

- Geographical range: Colorado, Kansas, Nebraska, South Dakota
- Period: Formative stage
- Dates: 1650–1750
- Type site: Lovitt Site in Dismal River area of Nebraska
- Major sites: Scott County State Park (Kansas)
- Preceded by: Archaic

The Dismal River culture is a Central Plains Indigenous culture dating from 1650 and 1750. The Dismal River people are believed to have spoken an Athabascan language and to have been part of the people later known to Europeans as the Plains Apache, who are enrolled in the Apache Tribe of Oklahoma today.

In the 1930s, archaeologists William Duncan Strong, Waldo Rudolph Wedel, and A. T. Hill observed the defining set of cultural attributes in the Dismal River area of Nebraska. The culture is also known as Dismal River aspect and Dismal River complex and differs from other contemporaneous Central Plains and Woodland traditions of the western Plains.

== Western Plains ==
Dismal River culture sites have been found in Nebraska, Kansas, Colorado and South Dakota. Eighteen sites were located in Hayes, Hooker, Cherry, Thomas and Lincoln counties in the Sandhills of Nebraska. Archeologists believe the Dismal culture people entered Nebraska around 1675.

Notable sites include:

- The first Dismal River location, the Lovett Site, in southwestern Nebraska.
- Findings at an archaeological site at Scott County State Park in Kansas that ties the Plains Apache to the Dismal River culture.

Other village cultures of the Western Plains include the Antelope Creek phase, Apishapa culture, Purgatoire phase, and Sopris phase.

== Apache ==
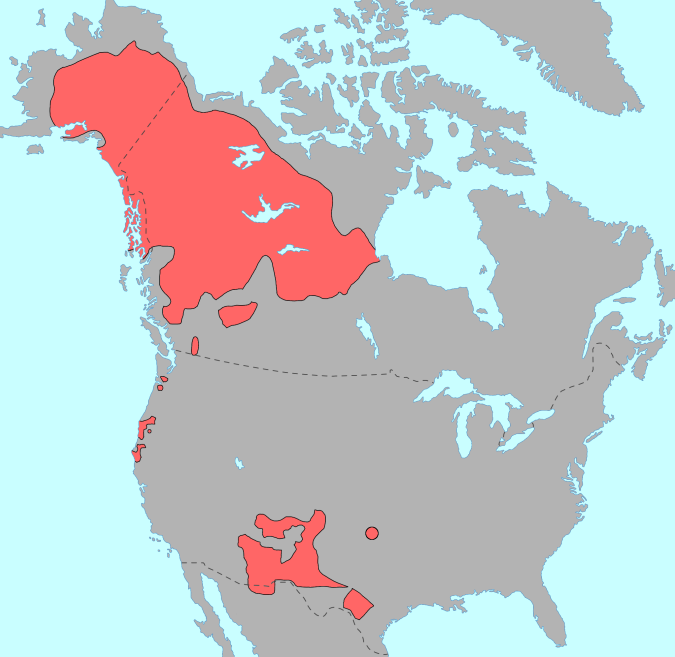
Precontact distribution of Athapascan, including the Apache and Navajo, after they migrated further south from the Plains

The Apache were Southern Athabaskan peoples whose ancestors migrated into the Great Plains and Southwest from what is known Alaska and northwestern Canada. There are two theories about how the ancestors of the Apache migrated into the Great Plains and southwestern United States. They may have traveled through the mountains, staying in a climate that they were accustomed to, or they may have migrated along the plains. Their descendants, the Navajo and Apache, speak Athabaskan languages.

The Apache bands generally attributed to the Dismal River culture are the Paloma and Quartelejo (also Cuartelejo) Apache people. Jicarilla Apache pottery has also been found in some of the Dismal River complex sites.

Some of the Dismal River people joined the Kiowa in the Black Hills of South Dakota to become the Kiowa-Apache or Plains Apache, migrating south to Texas and Oklahoma early in the 19th century. Most of the Dismal River people migrated south in the first half of the 18th century due to pressure from the Comanche from the west and Pawnee and French from the east. They later joined the Lipan Apache and Jicarilla Apache nations.

There have been no sites found to date of the period in which the Southern Athabaskans were nomadic, starting about 1500.

== Culture ==
The people of the Dismal River culture hunted, primarily bison but also elk and deer, using small side-notched, triangular or unnotched projectile points made of stone.

They supplemented their diet with cultivated corn and squash and gathered black walnuts, chokecherries, hackberries, and plums. Stones and bones were used for tools and they made pottery, called Dismal River pottery, which was distinctly gray-black. Much of their pottery was plain bowls, but there were also ollas, or jars, that were stamped with simple designs and had lips that were punctuated or incised. They farmed with bison scapula hoes until they obtained European iron hoes through trade.

=== Architecture ===
Dismal River villages generally had 15 to 20 structures located near streams. Round houses, shaped like hogans, were built slightly underground or on level ground, about 25 feet (7.6 m) in diameter. The structures were supported by wooden posts and covered with hides or other materials. In the center of their homes were hearths. Bell-shaped baking pits were found in the villages, which sometimes contained remains of human burial.

== Contact with Europeans ==
In October 1719, the Spanish governor of New Mexico, Antonio Valverde y Cosio ventured onto the Great Plains with a large force of Spanish and Indian soldiers to attempt to punish the Comanche and Ute Indians who were raiding Spanish and Jicarilla settlements. Valverde found no Comanches, but he met with El Cuartelejo Apaches (the Dismal River people) on the Arkansas (Napestle) River in what is now eastern Colorado. The Cuartelejo complained to him that the French were giving firearms to the Pawnee and "Jumano" (Wichita) peoples to their east. Valverde gives few details about the Cuartelejo but notably does not mention the existence of horses among them, commenting that they transported their goods with dogs.

In October 1724, the experienced French frontiersman, Étienne de Veniard, Sieur de Bourgmont, visited the Dismal River people at an encampment in Central Kansas, probably located south and west of Salina. He called the people "Padoucas." On approaching the encampment, Bourgmont encountered 80 mounted men, illustrating that some of the Dismal River people possessed horses by this time. Bourgmont described the encampment as having a population of more than 4,000 people, the people living in large dwellings occupied by about 30 persons each. The population was probably swollen by visitors who came from other villages to meet with Bourgmont. His observation that they lived in large dwellings (type of dwelling not described) is at odds with archaeological data. Bourgmont distributed gifts to the Indians, including a few guns. The Padouca had never seen such a variety of European goods. They were frightened of the guns.

Bourgmont wrote that the Padouca maintained permanent villages. They sent out regular hunting parties, in groups of 50 to 100 households. As one hunting party returned, another would leave, so that the village was occupied at all times. They journeyed up to five or six days' travel from their village to hunt. The Padouca sowed corn and pumpkins. They obtained tobacco and horses from trade with the Spanish in New Mexico in exchange for tanned buffalo skins. The explorer noticed that some of the Apache still used flint knives for skinning buffalo and felling trees, an indicator that not much European trade had reached them.

By 1725, the Dismal culture people had left Nebraska, and within a few years after Bourgmont's visit, the Padouca or Dismal River people whom he had met in Kansas were gone, pushed south by the Comanche.

== See also ==
- Dismal River culture sites
  - Cedar Point Village, near Limon, east of Denver, Colorado
  - Franktown Cave, south of Denver, Colorado
- Jicarilla Apache
- List of prehistoric sites in Colorado
- Plains Apache
- Prehistory of Colorado
