= Florence Hawley Ellis =

American dendrochronologist

- Born: Florence May Hawley; September 17, 1906; Cananea, Sonora, Mexico
- Died: 1991 (aged 84–85)
- Spouse(s): Donovan Senter; Bruce Ellis

Academic background
- Education: University of Arizona; University of Chicago

Academic work
- Discipline: anthropology archeology
- Sub-discipline: dendrochronology ethnohistory
- Institutions: University of Arizona; University of New Mexico

Florence May Hawley Ellis (née Florence May Hawley, also known as Florence Hawley Senter; September 17, 1906 – 1991) was one of the first anthropologists to work extensively on dendrochronology, or tree-ring dating. She conducted archaeological and ethnographic research in the Southwestern United States; and undertook some of the first dendrochronological research in eastern North America in the mid 20th century, examining samples from a number of archaeological sites. She was also highly regarded as a passionate teacher who pushed her students toward greatness by encouraging them to think for themselves and work hard for what they wanted to achieve. Although faced with many challenges in her career, and discriminated against for being a woman, she persevered in her research and became a great influence both for her students and for other women in her field.

== Background ==
Florence Hawley was born in Cananea, Sonora, Mexico, where her father was chief chemist for a copper mine. In 1913, after the outbreak of the Mexican Revolution, her family moved to Miami, Arizona. She was introduced to archaeology at a young age from her father during his excavating of ruins around their home in southern Arizona.

In 1936 Florence married archaeologist Donovan Senter; together they had a daughter named Andrea. In 1950, after a divorce from Senter, she married Bruce Ellis who was a historian. Their marriage lasted until the time of his death in 1985.

She began teaching at the University of Arizona in 1929, where she was introduced to dendrochronology in a class taught by A. E. Douglass. She began teaching at the University of New Mexico fall of 1934 until she retired in 1971. It is possible that more professional anthropologists in the United States were taught by Hawley than by any other member of the profession. Even after her retirement she remained active in field research up until her death in 1991. She continued to write and excavate. She was passionate about her work and even after a broken hip returned to the field during her recuperation to supervise. She broke new ground in her research by developing and applying innovative techniques of chemical analysis, dendrochronology, ethnohistory, and ethnoarchaeology.

== Education ==
Hawley graduated with a B.A. from the University of Arizona in 1927 with a major in English and a minor in anthropology. She received her M.A. in anthropology the next year. She completed her Ph.D. in anthropology at the University of Chicago after teaching at the University of Arizona. She used her excavations from Chetro Ketl for her dissertation, which was on the dated prehistory of Chetro Ketl. She applied the new techniques of dendrochronology and stratigraphic dating of the archaeological deposits to more fully understand the history and evolution of Chetro Ketl.

== Employment history ==
Hawley began teaching at the University of Arizona in 1929. By 1933, the University of Arizona was faced with financial difficulties due to the Great Depression, and they asked most of the young faculty to take a year's leave of absence, which included Hawley. In the fall of 1934, she took a job teaching at the University of New Mexico in the Department of Anthropology where she made less than the male professors. As a professor Hawley was not considered easy; she expected her students to learn and to think on their own. She taught over 20 courses, several of which were usually taught by men. She was found at one point to be teaching more courses than anyone else in the anthropology department. Hawley always brought new theoretical approaches as well as her own ideas into focus while teaching. Her students knew they were expected to organize and comprehend data, in addition to become familiar with the bibliographical material. She continued to work and to teach students in the field after her retirement.

== Honors ==
Hawley strove for equality for men and women in not only economic but also professional recognition. She contributed to this through participating in the "Women's Movement". Because of her superiority in her research as well as teaching, and her persistence to the idea of equality, she was honored at the "Daughters of the Desert" symposium as a leader among the women anthropologist who have worked in the Southwest. Hawley served as president of the American Society for Ethnohistory in 1969 and in 1987 she was honored as one of 45 distinguished women featured in a traveling Smithsonian exhibit named "Daughters of the Desert". The University of New Mexico acknowledged her accomplishments by granting her an honorary Doctorate of Letters in 1988. The Ghost Ranch of Abiquiu, where she conducted her work in the 1980s, housed her extensive library in a large museum complex that bears her name.

== Research ==
Florence Hawley applied the training she received from A. E. Douglass's dendrochronology class to tree ring analysis in the Chaco Canyon excavations where she worked with the University of New Mexico field program in the summers of 1929, 1930, and 1931. She conducted ceramic analyses with materials from Chetro Ketl and other sites in the area, and her ceramic chronologies were independently confirmed by tree ring dates. From the Late 1950s through the 1960s she directed a summer archaeological field schools through the University of New Mexico. One of the most prominent discoveries was that of San Gabriel de Yunge, the first Spanish Capital of New Mexico, which dated from 1600, found near San Juan Pueblo. Her work on dendrochronology helped provides a baseline for southwestern chronologies and her work constituted a technical expertise which is still largely in demand. Hawley also conducted dendrochronological research in eastern North America, conducting some of the first such work in the region. She began her tree-ring research in the Midwest around the 1933 - 1934 academic year. She collected tree - ring specimens or inspected samples of archaeological wood from the University of Chicago's excavations in southern Illinois. In 1937, she continued her Midwestern dendrochronological fieldwork and collected 1000 living-tree specimens in eight different states in an effort to identify the climate signal recorded by trees across the Midwest. In 1941, Hawley published Tree-Ring Analysis and Dating in the Mississippi Drainage where she presented the major problems she and her team faced: they were working with new species, they were working across a huge area, there was a shortage in old growth timber because of the extensive tree cutting, and the wood was not preserved well because of the damp mound sediments. In 2019, the Tennessee Valley Authority unearthed tree ring data in their archives that was collected by Hawley but that she was never allowed to publish.

== Key excavations ==
Florence Hawley participated in many field excavations, including her work at the Chetro Ketl site in Chaco Canyon. After her retirement she continued to offer field training to interested students, which was based around the Ghost Ranch of Abiquiu. In 1934 she and her crew worked in western Kentucky and the Wickliffe mounds as well as in the Norris Basin in Tennessee collecting living- tree specimens, charcoal, and modern specimens. She also did work in the Mississippi Valley, as well as many Midwestern states.

== Selected publications ==
- Hawley, Florence. "The Significance of the Dated Prehistory of Chetro Ketl, Chaco Canon, New Mexico." The University of New Mexico Bulletin, vol. 1, no. 1, 1934.
- Hawley, Florence. "Relationship of Southern Cedar Growth to Precipitation and Run Off." Ecology 18 (1937): 398- 405.
- Hawley, Florence. "A Dendrochronology in Two Mississippi Drainage Tree-Ring Areas." Tree-Ring Bulletin 5 (1938): 3–7.
- Hawley, Florence. "Tree Ring Dating for Southeastern Mounds." In: Webb, W.S. (Ed.), An Archaeological Survey of the Norris Basin in Eastern Tennessee. Bureau of American Ethnology, Bulletin 118. Washington, D.C.: Smithsonian Institution; Government Printing Office, 1938. p. 359-362.
- Hawley, Florence May; Wedel, Mildred Mott (1941). Tree-Ring Analysis and Dating in the Mississippi Drainage, Issue 2. University of Chicago Press.
- Hawley, Florence. From Drought to Drought an Examination of Archaeology. Santa Fe: Sunstone Press, 1988.
- Hawley, Florence. San Gabriel Del Yungue as Seen by an Archaeologist: Examination of an Historic Site in New Mexico. Santa Fe: Sunstone Press, 1989.
- Hawley, Florence. Pueblo Indians: Archaeologic and Ethnologic Data: Acoma-Laguna Land Claims. Taylor and Francis, Inc., 1977.
- Hawley, Florence, Richard Ford, & Myra E. Jenkins. When Cultures Meet: Remembering San Gabriel del Yunge Oweenge. Santa Fe: Sunstone Press, 1987.
