= James Bennett Griffin =

American archaeologist (1905–1997)

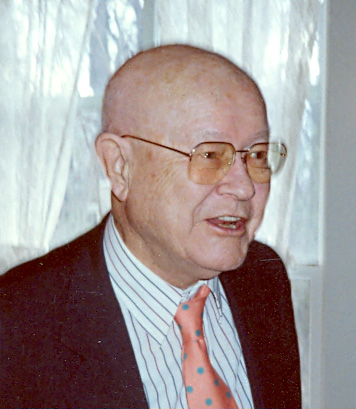
- Born: January 12, 1905; Atchison, Kansas
- Died: May 31, 1997 (aged 92); Bethesda, Maryland
- Education: University of Chicago, (BA, 1927; MA 1930); University of Michigan (PhD 1936)
- Known for: Eastern North American prehistory
- Awards: Elected to the National Academy of Sciences in 1968
- Scientific career
- Fields: Anthropology, archaeology
- Workplaces: University of Michigan

James Bennett Griffin (January 12, 1905 – May 31, 1997) was an American archaeologist. He is regarded as one of the most influential archaeologists in North America in the 20th century.

== Personal life ==
Born in Atchison, Kansas, the son of Charles and Maude Griffin, Jimmy and his family subsequently moved to Denver, Colorado. His father was a supplier for railroad equipment. Griffin's interest in archaeology was born through reading as a child and his love for visiting museums. When Jimmy was eleven his family moved to Oak Park, Illinois, where he lived until he enrolled in college. He attended Oak Park schools and was a cheerleader at Oak Park and River Forest High School. At school in Oak Park he met Fred Eggan and Wendell C. Bennett. His friendship with these two schoolmates would last into graduate school and his professional career in anthropology. In 1933, he married Ruby Fletcher. They had three children: John, David, and James. Griffin retired in 1976 and remained in Ann Arbor for several years. His wife died in 1979, and in 1984, he moved to Washington D.C. He met Mary Dewitt there and soon married her. They spent twelve years together living in Washington before Griffin’s death in Bethesda, Maryland aged 92.

== Education ==
Griffin attended and graduated from Oak Park and River Forest High School where he became a champion swimmer, as well as cheer leader. He then enrolled into the University of Chicago in 1923 where he initially planned on studying Business Administration. After two years in the BA program, he transferred to the program of General Science. He graduated with his bachelor's degree in 1927. After graduating, Griffin took a brief break from school to work for Amoco, but later returned to the University of Chicago. In 1930, he graduated with a Master of Arts Degree in Sociology and Anthropology. In 1936 he was awarded a special Ph.D. in anthropology from the University of Michigan, as the department there did not yet have a formal Ph.D. program.

== Professional career ==
Griffin accepted a research fellowship in 1933 at the University of Michigan. That same year, he moved to Ann Arbor, where he would live for the next five decades. His first fieldwork was conducted in the summer of 1929, where he excavated at the Parker Heights Mound located in Indian Mounds Park near Quincy, Illinois, a project led by William Krogman. By 1931, Griffin had gained enough experience in the field to conduct his own excavations. He led an excavation of Upper Susquehanna Valley, Pennsylvania, for the Tioga Point Museum. The following season, the project had to be postponed due to budget cuts caused by the depression. Griffin spent the season writing a manuscript about the summer spent excavating the Parker Heights Mound a few years earlier. However, this manuscript was not published until 1991 by the Center for American Archeology in Kampsville, Illinois. In the fall of 1939, Griffin accompanied James A. Ford and Philip Phillips on the start of a Lower Mississippi survey project. In 1945, he was appointed Associate Professor of Archaeology at Michigan. Four years later, he became a full professor. Between 1940 and 1946, Griffin spent nearly three field seasons working on surface surveys, while his partner Phillips worked on stratigraphic excavations at sites in the southeast, work published by Phillips, Ford, and Griffin in 1951 in a monograph that has come to be regarded as a classic in American Archaeology, Archaeological Survey in the Lower Mississippi Alluvial Valley 1940-1947. After this project, Griffin began work with Albert Spaulding on the Central Mississippi Survey in 1950. Fieldwork was done in southeast Missouri and at the Roots site near the Kaskaskia River, but the main project was at Cahokia. These projects continued for a few more years, but Griffin stepped down as the leader of them in the mid-1950s. Griffin also conducted work in Europe, Mexico, and the former Soviet Union.

Griffin’s primary involvement in field activities shifted to a broader synthetic study and overview of archaeology itself. However, he still was involved with fieldwork. Between the years of 1963 and 1964, Griffin supervised an excavation at the Norton Mound group, a Hopewell tradition-related site in Grand Rapids, Michigan. Soon after this, one of Griffins students, James E. Price, encouraged him to return to the northern end of the Lower Mississippi Valley with the Powers Phase project in southeast Missouri (1968–1972). The involvement with this site helped graduate students gain experience in new collecting and field techniques.

Though Griffin is known as a superb field and technical research archaeologist, he was also a distinguished professor whose teaching abilities inspired many of his students throughout the years to become archaeologists as well. He helped train dozens of North American archaeologists, many of whom went on to prominence themselves. His legacy as a professor was that in the 1970s and 1980s, many of the major archaeological graduate programs in North America were staffed by Griffin’s students. Even now, most archaeologists who focus on Eastern Woodlands prehistory are linked to Griffin or one or more of his students in some way. Those who knew him personally said he had an extraordinary ability to teach, and that his students worked hard to gain his respect. In addition to his teaching at Michigan, he served as a visiting professor at many schools, including the University of California, Berkeley in 1960, the University of Colorado in 1962, and Louisiana State University in 1971.

Throughout his career, Griffin was a regular participant at conferences and meetings of numerous professional organizations. His record of attendance was extraordinary at both the Society for American Archaeology meetings (which he helped found in 1934) and the Southeastern Archaeological Conference (which he founded with James A. Ford in 1937). He highly sought after by symposium organizers as a presenter or discussant. Griffin was well known for his extraordinary memory of the tens of thousands of artifacts he had seen in collections from all over Eastern North America—making connections between an artifact in one collection to another artifact he may have examined many years earlier at another institution. His ability to make these connections across space and time often yielded dramatic insights from a single photographic slide or presented paper. He was also known for his a sharp wit and his devastatingly sarcastic and thoroughly non-PC sense of humor, which he used to great effect. He could be a merciless critic of what he considered poorly done archaeology or sloppy scholarship, both verbally and in print. Most notably, he was embroiled in a long and antagonistic intellectual relationship with the next reigning lion in American archaeology, Lewis R. Binford.

Griffin retired from Michigan in 1976, but eight years later, he moved to Washington D.C. to become associated with the Department of Anthropology at the Smithsonian Institution until he died in 1997.

== Accomplishments and awards ==
Griffin received the Viking Fund Award and Medal in Archaeology in 1957 from the Wenner Grenn Foundation. He was elected to the National Academy of Sciences in 1968. He received the University of Michigan's Faculty Achievement Award in 1971; the same year he received an Honorary Doctorate from Indiana University. The University of Michigan honored him with the Henry Russell Lectureship for Outstanding Research in 1972. The Society for American Archaeology awarded Griffin the Fryxell Award for excellence in interdisciplinary research in 1980 and the Distinguished Service Award in 1984.

He served as the director of the Museum of Anthropology of Michigan from 1946-1975. He organized and managed the Ceramic Repository for the Eastern United States, a central source of information and collections about prehistoric pottery based out of the University of Michigan. He and H.R. Crane founded the University’s Radiocarbon Laboratory that was in operation from 1949-1970. He served many years in the Council of the International Union of Prehistoric and Protohistoric Sciences. He was considered the premier Eastern North American ceramics expert by many of his colleagues. He wrote more than 260 articles and eight books about ceramics and applying other sciences to archaeology. Altogether, Griffin was among the most honored archaeologists of his generation.

== Selected publications ==
- (1937) The Archaeological Remains of the Chiwere Sioux
- (1937) The Chronological Position and Ethnological Relationships of the Fort Ancient Aspect (American Antiquity, Vol. 2, No. 4)
- (1942) Adena Pottery
- (1942) On the Historic Location of the Tutelo and the Mohetan in the Ohio Valley
- (1945) An Interpretation of Siouan Archaeology in the Piedmont of North Carolina and Virginia
- (1945) The Box Elder Mound in la Salle County, Illinois
- (1953) Archeological Survey In the Lower Mississippi Alluvial Valley, 1940-1947
- (1955) Chronology and Dating Process
- (1967) Eastern North American Archaeology: A Summary. Science...
- (1969) Identification of the Sources of Hopewellian Obsidian in the Middle West
- (1985) An Individual's Participation in American Archaeology, 1928-1985
- (1985) The Formation of the Society for American Archaeology
