= Elizabeth Johnson (advocate) =

American advocate of Kansas history

Elizabeth A. Johnson
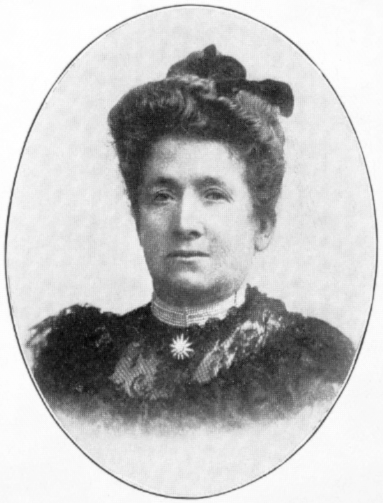
- Born: Elizabeth A. Walsh; February 2, 1849; Carrickmacross, County Monaghan, Ireland
- Died: August 10, 1924 (aged 75); La Puente, California, US
- Burial place: St. Michael's Cemetery, Brookfield, Missouri
- Spouse: George Johnson (m. 1883)

Elizabeth A. Johnson (née Walsh; 1849–1924) was a prominent advocate of Kansas history. She discovered, purchased, and donated the land that makes up the Pawnee Indian Museum State Historic Site to the state of Kansas in 1899. At the time, it was considered to be the first place the United States flag was raised on the state of Kansas.

== Biography ==
Elizabeth A. Walsh was born in Carrickmacross, County Monaghan, Ireland on February 2, 1849. She and her parents moved to Linn County, Missouri in 1870.

She married George Johnson of White Rock, Kansas in 1883.

She died at her daughter's home in La Puente, California on August 10, 1924.

== Pike-Pawnee site ==
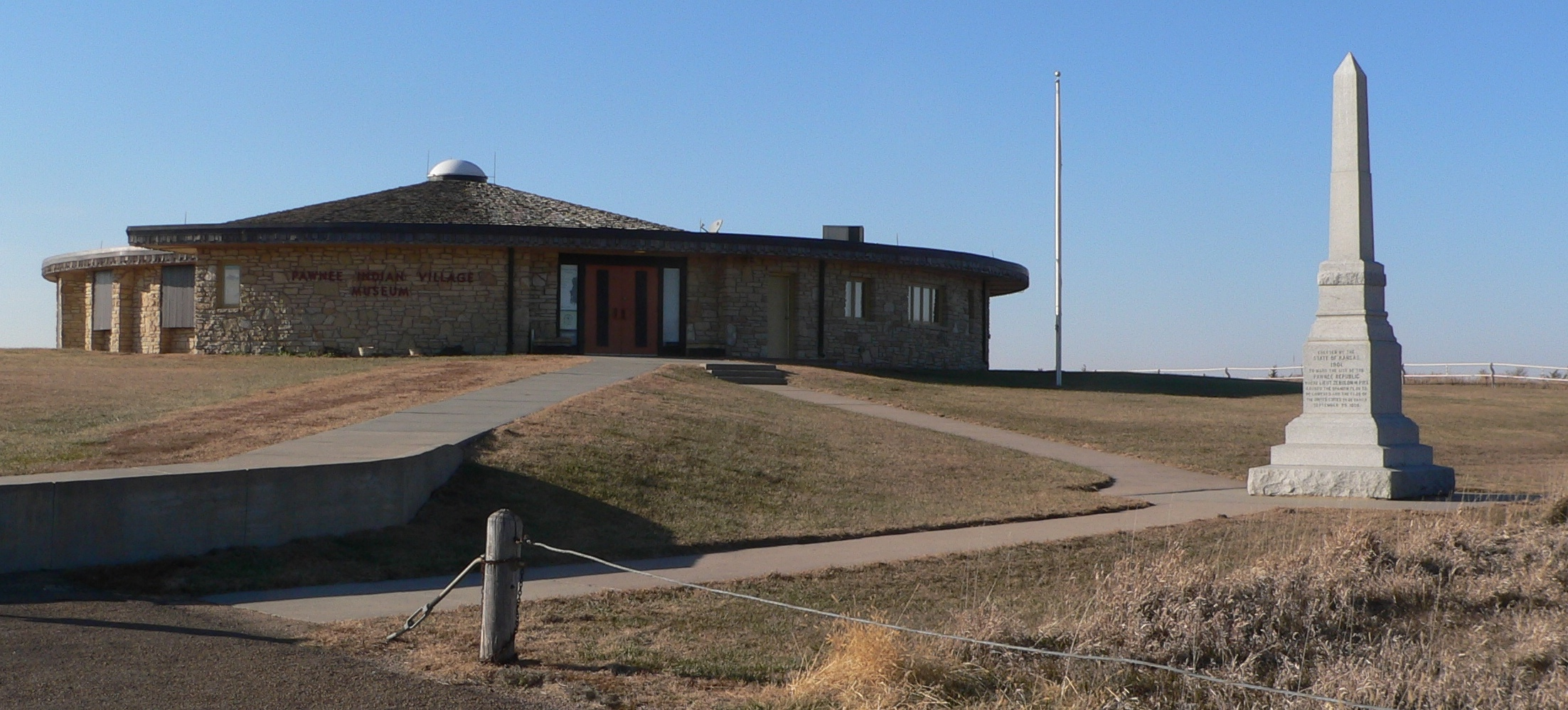
Museum and monument at village site preserved by Johnson. When erected in 1901, the monument was 26 feet (7.9 m) tall; weather damage had reduced it to about 15 feet (4.6 m) by 2004. In that year, it was largely destroyed by a tornado, but in 2006 was restored to a height of about 15 feet, using original pieces.

In the 1870s, Johnson became interested in Zebulon Pike and the possibility that the events surrounding the raising of the U.S. flag occurred nearby. She discovered what was believed to be the site in 1875 and, after studying Pike's journals and investigating another reported Pawnee site in southern Nebraska, concluded that this was the village that Pike had visited. To protect the site from being plowed, she and her husband bought the land. In 1901, the Johnsons donated the site to the state of Kansas for historic preservation.

Johnson's claim was supported by Elliott Coues, who had edited Pike's journal; with his endorsement, it was accepted by the Kansas State Historical Society. In 1901, Johnson donated the land to the state of Kansas, which built a 26-foot (7.9 m) granite monument commemorating Pike's symbolic triumph over Spain. At the dedication of the monument, several of the speakers drew parallels between the Pike episode and the recent American victory in the Spanish–American War. In 1906, a four-day festival was held to celebrate the centennial of the flag incident.

Subsequent research showed that Pike's expedition had not visited this village, but the Kitkehahki village now known as the Pike-Pawnee Village Site, located on the Republican River in Webster County in south-central Nebraska. The error was a fortunate one, however: it led to the preservation of the site in Kansas, whereas the Nebraska site had been degraded by years of cultivation.
