= Bill Trotter =

American baseball player (1903–1984)

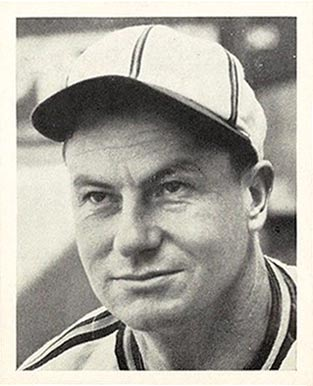
- Pitcher
- Born: August 10, 1903; Cisne, Illinois, U.S.
- Died: August 26, 1984 (aged 76); Evansville, Indiana, U.S.
- Batted: Right Threw: Right

MLB debut
- April 23, 1937, for the St. Louis Browns

Last MLB appearance
- September 22, 1944, for the St. Louis Cardinals

MLB statistics
- Win–loss record: 22–34
- Earned run average: 5.40
- Strikeouts: 158
- Stats at Baseball Reference

Teams
- St. Louis Browns (1937–1942); Washington Senators (1942); St. Louis Cardinals (1944)

William Felix Trotter (August 10, 1903 – August 26, 1984) was a Major League Baseball pitcher. He played all or part of seven seasons in the majors, between 1937 and 1944, for the St. Louis Browns, Washington Senators and St. Louis Cardinals.

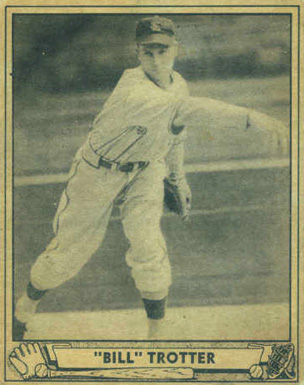
Trotter in 1940
