= Cisne, Illinois =

Cisne
- Village
- Location of Cisne in Wayne County, Illinois.
- Coordinates: 38°30′50″N 88°26′14″W
- Country: United States
- State: Illinois
- County: Wayne

Area
  - Total: 0.63 sq mi (1.63 km^{2})
  - Land: 0.63 sq mi (1.63 km^{2})
  - Water: 0 sq mi (0.00 km^{2})
- Elevation: 456 ft (139 m)

Population (2020)
  - Total: 634
  - Density: 1,005.7/sq mi (388.32/km^{2})
- Time zone: UTC−6 (CST)
  - Summer (DST): UTC−5 (CDT)
- ZIP code: 62823
- Area code: 618
- FIPS code: 17–14455
- GNIS feature ID: 2397626

Cisne is a village in Wayne County, Illinois, United States. As of the 2020 census, Cisne had a population of 634.

== History ==
Cisne was named in 1870 in honor of Levi Cisne on the suggestion of Charles A. Beecher, who was influential in building the railroad and the station around which the village of Cisne grew.

== Geography ==
According to the 2010 census, Cisne has a total area of 0.63 square miles (1.63 km^{2}), all land.

== Demographics ==
Historical population
| Census | Pop. | Note | %± |
|---|---|---|---|
| 1880 | 185 | | — |
| 1900 | 400 | | — |
| 1910 | 373 | | −6.7% |
| 1920 | 526 | | 41.0% |
| 1930 | 467 | | −11.2% |
| 1940 | 628 | | 34.5% |
| 1950 | 628 | | 0.0% |
| 1960 | 615 | | −2.1% |
| 1970 | 615 | | 0.0% |
| 1980 | 705 | | 14.6% |
| 1990 | 645 | | −8.5% |
| 2000 | 673 | | 4.3% |
| 2010 | 672 | | −0.1% |
| 2020 | 634 | | −5.7% |
U.S. Decennial Census

As of the census of 2000, there were 673 people, 291 households, and 185 families residing in the village. The population density was 1,054.8 inhabitants per square mile (407.3/km^{2}). There were 325 housing units at an average density of 509.4 units per square mile (196.7 units/km^{2}). The racial makeup of the village was 98.81% White, 0.30% African American, 0.30% Asian, and 0.59% from two or more races. Hispanic or Latino of any race were 0.59% of the population.

There were 291 households, out of which 26.5% had children under the age of 18 living with them, 51.5% were married couples living together, 9.3% had a female householder with no husband present, and 36.4% were non-families. 34.0% of all households were made up of individuals, and 22.7% had someone living alone who was 65 years of age or older. The average household size was 2.22 and the average family size was 2.78.

In the village, the age distribution of the population shows 21.8% under the age of 18, 9.8% from 18 to 24, 22.6% from 25 to 44, 18.3% from 45 to 64, and 27.5% who were 65 years of age or older. The median age was 42 years. For every 100 females, there were 83.9 males. For every 100 females age 18 and over, there were 76.5 males.

The median income for a household in the village was $26,172, and the median income for a family was $34,286. Males had a median income of $26,635 versus $25,234 for females. The per capita income for the village was $14,044. About 12.4% of families and 15.5% of the population were below the poverty line, including 13.5% of those under age 18 and 22.4% of those age 65 or over.

== Notable people ==
- A. T. Hill, Nebraska State Historical Society archaeologist; born in Cisne
- Bill Trotter, pitcher for several teams; born in Cisne
