= Albert Spaulding =

Albert C. Spaulding
- Born: August 14, 1914; Chouteau, Montana
- Died: May 29, 1990 (aged 75)
- Education: Montana State University (B.A.), University of Michigan (M.A.), Columbia University (PhD)
- Known for: Quantitative statistics in archaeology, prehistory of North America, prehistory of the Aleutian Islands, American and Asian ethnography, physical anthropology
- Scientific career
- Fields: Anthropology, Archaeology
- Workplaces: University of Michigan, University of Kansas, University of Oregon, UC Santa Barbara
- Thesis: Northeastern archaeology and general trends in the northern forest zone
- Doctoral advisor: William Duncan Strong

Albert Clanton Spaulding (August 13, 1914 – May 29, 1990) was an American anthropologist and processual archaeologist who encouraged the application of quantitative statistics in archaeological research and the legitimacy of anthropology as a science. His push for thorough statistical analysis in the field triggered a series of academic debates with archaeologist James Ford in which the nature of archaeological typologies was meticulously investigated—a dynamic discourse now known as the Ford-Spaulding Debate. He was also instrumental in increasing funding for archaeology through the National Science Foundation.

== Early life and education ==
Albert Spaulding was born on August 14, 1914, in Choteau, Montana. He grew up in Missoula, Montana and attended the University of Montana, where his father was the dean of the School of Forestry. During his sophomore year, he married Charlotte Smith and later had two children, Ronald and Catherine. He received his B.A. in economics in 1935 and promptly enrolled in the University of Michigan's anthropology M.A. program, receiving his degree in 1937. He pursued his Ph.D. in anthropology at Columbia University in 1938 under the guidance of William Duncan Strong, a firm advocate of the direct historical approach. In 1939, he became the first anthropology graduate student to be named university fellow. During his time as a doctoral student, he developed his stalwart perspectives on archaeology, namely its justification as a true science and the need for its practitioners to think quantitatively when necessary. Relating his initial intellectual experience in archaeology, Spaulding recalled, "my fundamental interest at the time [...] was clarification of the basic concepts of archaeology, which led me into explicit applications of quantitative technique and explicit definitions of archaeological problems in terms of relationship between or among well-defined variables." As a result, Spaulding—along with his colleague Gordon Willey—regularly contemplated the interrelations of form, space, and time in archaeological study, an extensive and critical concept he termed the "dimensions of archaeology". Although he completed his studies in 1942, the potency of World War II forced him to delay publication of his dissertation until 1946, upon which he was awarded his degree.

== Career ==
Spaulding's archaeological career spanned every corner of North America, beginning with a brief teaching position at the University of Montana after receiving his B.A. in 1935. During his time as a master's student at the University of Michigan, he joined the Works Progress Administration of the New Deal as an archaeological supervisor, participating in projects throughout South Dakota, Nebraska, Mississippi, and Kentucky until 1941. While his dissertation stalled, Spaulding took advantage of his time and joined the War Mapping Program of the U.S. Forest Service as an assistant topographic and photogrammetric engineer. He mapped the coastal ranges of southern California before traveling to Pennsylvania.

In the wake of World War II, having received his Ph.D., Spaulding accepted an offer to teach at the University of Kansas, where he stayed for only three semesters. He also accepted the position of Assistant Curator of the university's Museum of Anthropology, where he spent most of his time administering the archaeological and ethnographic collections and exhibits. He left KU in 1947 to accept a much-desired assistant teaching position and assistant curatorship at the University of Michigan and its Museum of Anthropology. The position he vacated at KU was filled by Carlyle S. Smith. Eventually, he attained the recognition of full-time professor and curator, but left the university in 1959 to become the program director of the Office of Social Science at the National Science Foundation, a new addition at the time. Originally, he was assigned director to both the "Anthropology" and "History and Philosophy of Science" programs within the foundation, but became the full-time director of Anthropology in 1961. It was here that he expressed the inherent need for anthropology to be considered a true science, intimately developing the attitudes directed towards the social sciences.

After a brief appointment at Yale University, Spaulding left NSF in 1963 to serve as the chairman of the Department of Anthropology and professor at the University of Oregon for three years. He ultimately accepted a teaching position at the University of California, Santa Barbara, where he served as the dean of the College of Letters and Science from 1967 to 1971. He retired in 1983, returning to the university to teach as an honored emeritus professor until he developed an illness in 1988. He died in 1990 of cancer.

== Field projects ==
Spaulding participated in a number of field projects during the course of his lifetime but documented comparatively little field material as his interests resided mostly in the refinement of theory and method. The only reports considered somewhat complete are those on the Arzberger site in South Dakota and Agattu Island in the Aleutian Islands.

- 1936 – Rice Lake and Spencer Lake, Wisconsin
- 1937 – Butler County, Kentucky
- 1939 – Arzberger site in Hughes County, and Buffalo Pasture site in Stanley County, South Dakota
- 1940 – WPA Archaeological Survey of Mississippi
- 1941 – Wynot, Nebraska
- 1956-1947 – Hanthorne site in Labette County, Kansas
- 1949 – Agattu Island and the Aleutian Islands, Alaska
- 1949 – Krugloi Point, Sitka, Alaska
- 1949 – Cahokia Mounds, Illinois
- 1953 – Upper Great Lakes survey, Garnell site in Michigan
- 1970s-1980s – Santa Cruz Island, California

== Ford-Spaulding Debate ==
While the concept of culture history dominated the archaeological discipline throughout the early 20th century, unrest as to the empirical suppositions of the theory fermented during the 1950s and 1960s, just as the theoretical underpinnings of the "New Archaeology" came to fruition. At the same time, the nature and legitimacy of archaeological types became a prime target of academic dispute, for some archaeologists held the belief that the cultural popularity of defined types created a normal frequency distribution that, in turn, validated such types and reflected cultural norms. This "common sense" theory of cultural units pitted the real against the arbitrary, rooted in empirical and theoretical rationalizations. Debates flourished as proponents of the idea defended the irrationality of an empirical type, coming to a head with a series of publications that swiftly ran its course through the pages of American Antiquity known as the Ford-Spaulding Debate.

In 1953, Spaulding published a counter-argument of sorts titled "Statistical techniques for the discovery of artifact types" that detailed a statistical classification method for recognizing real inherent types in prehistoric material. He believed using cluster algorithms to group artifacts of similar attributes favored by the maker— corroborated by chi-squared tests— produced such meaningful and evident types, giving credence to the methods of evolutionary archaeology. In response, James Ford took the side of a nascent post-processualism and contested Spaulding's self-perceived emic modus operandi, declaring that archaeological types are more or less subjective constructs of the archaeologist and that the concept of culture itself is quite etic. Spaulding's method would only serve to highlight the extent to which temporally popular styles prevailed and categorize cultural continuity without seriously considering the basics of culture theory. Even so, Ford believed that archaeological types could, in some measure, reflect cultural norms, but the idea that they were mostly subjective units created through trial and error and convenient testing dominated his understanding.

Spaulding responded with haste, challenging Ford's methodologies. His technique of simply "counting and ranking" types was not a reliable measurement, nor was it scientific. The lack of any goodness of fit testing left Ford's seriation of types questionable in the absence of mathematical precision and sophistication— a virtue that Spaulding constantly sought to refine. Therefore, Ford's ordinal scales of measurement were not scientifically valid; "[He] simply does not know what the word 'measurement' denotes." Cluster analysis strictly served to locate clusters of attributes—not automatic emic types, as Ford understood—that were then left to the archaeologist to interpret their meaning. These clusters were more "functional types" in the sense that they were socially and culturally significant in relation to the discernible behaviors of the maker. Spaulding concluded that because such cluster patterning existed when statistically arranged—and that artifacts were human creations that could be empirically identified and sorted into sets—meant that designated types must be "real," meaning that they were categories recognized by the individuals who manufactured and used the artifacts in question.

Ford desired a type "designed for the reconstruction of culture history in time and space", independent of an archaeologist's core definition or attributes of a type, considering one may choose an emically "wrong" combination of attributes as the cultural continuum constantly evolves. Such types are merely created by the archaeologist based on any discontinuity observed in the record. This materialistic comprehension of types clashed against Spaulding's essentialist notion of the same, and it is argued that the two scholars were unaware of the stark differences in theory and question in each of their ripostes. The Ford-Spaulding Debate hardly resolved the uncertainty of types and prompted many readers and participants to simply compromise; both Spaulding and Ford, in their own rights, were correct.

== Influence on anthropology and archaeology ==
=== Theory and methodology ===
Spaulding remains one of the early forerunners of the New Archaeology. He was known for urging his fellow scholars to make use of quantitative statistics in archaeological research and maintaining his belief that anthropology was a rightful scientific discipline. As a result, his rigorous statistical methodologies and perseverance towards due scientific recognition remain pivotal elements in the historical evolution of archaeological research.

==== Quantitative archaeology ====
Undoubtedly, Spaulding's greatest contribution to the field of archaeology was his insistence on using appropriate methods, namely quantification. He asserted that quantitative applications promoted a more accurate methodology— a necessary component of scientific research. This is reflected in his hypotheses of archaeological data, where patterns can be inductively extracted from an attentive analysis of the data itself. The Ford-Spaulding Debate publicly emphasized this ideology and was instrumental in establishing an artifact classification method, acting as an impetus behind the processual movement of the 1960s. His introduction of the chi-squared test in evaluating the validity of typological patterns according to behavioral relations contributed to the "behavioral turn" seen in the New Archaeology of quantitative application and behavioral reasoning. His theories greatly influenced Lewis Binford (arguably the "founder" of the New Archaeology) who found virtue in his statistical rigor and similarly believed in archaeology as a science, actively seeking to explain human experience rather than simply describe it. Binford, once a graduate student at the University of Michigan, credited Spaulding as his "most valuable teacher", "an intellectual rock of constructive thought and keen insight."

==== Archaeological dimensions ====
In 1960, Spaulding explored his doctoral ponderings of the "dimensions of archaeology" in a critical— yet relatively forgotten— paper in which he defined a dimension as "an aspect or property of the subject matter which requires its own special measuring device." The basic analytical measurements within archaeology consisted of space, time, and form (and their interrelations), an essential concept still recognized in archaeological analysis today. Archaeologists study artifacts in the context of these three dimensions, and all archaeological inferences are affixed to any of these measurements. The relation of form and time represents a diachronic approach while the relation of form and space represents a synchronic approach; the alliance of all three constitutes a comprehensive archaeological unit and the foundation of context. Although Spaulding's discussion focused largely on form and its conceivable statistical measurements, his understanding of the reality of all three dimensions can be considered a moment of clarity in the theory of archaeology.

=== National Science Foundation ===
The discipline of anthropology has long been torn between the realms of science and the humanities. While those studying archaeology, physical anthropology, and cultural anthropology contend that their fields are entitled scientific inquiries, others believe anthropologists are restricted to the boundaries of the humanities. Spaulding was a staunch advocate of the former due to his passionate tenets concerning the place of quantification in archaeology. He carried this perspective with him to his director's chair at the National Science Foundation, transforming the way the agency viewed the discipline of anthropology and instituting an invaluable resource. Millions of dollars became available to anthropologists through the NSF as the agency came to recognize the significance of their fieldwork. Today, the NSF still provides funding and support for scientific anthropological research including archaeology, archaeometry, biological anthropology, cultural anthropology, and linguistics.

== Honors and leadership roles ==
- 1939 – Named university fellow at Columbia University
- 1953-1964 – Associate editor, secretary, vice president, and president of the Society for American Archaeology
- 1958 – President of the Michigan Archaeological Society
- 1963–1966, 1973-1976 – Served on the executive board of the American Anthropological Association
- 1964 – Vice president of Section H of the American Association for the Advancement of Science
- 1967 – Served on nominating committee of the American Association for the Advancement of Science
- 1967 – President of the Society for California Archaeology
- 1978-1981 – Served on finance committee of the American Anthropological Association
- 1981 – Awarded Distinguished Service Award by the Society for American Archaeology
- 1985 – Awarded Special Award for Distinguished Service by the Society for American Archaeology
- Associate director of American Antiquity
- Fellow of the American Anthropological Association
- Fellow of the Society for American Archaeology
- Distinguished Professor Emeritus at the University of California, Santa Barbara
- Albert C. Spaulding memorial lectureship created at the University of California, Santa Barbara

== Selected works ==
- Spaulding, Albert C. (1988). "Distinguished Lecture: Archeology and anthropology". American Anthropologist. New Series. 90 (2): 263–71. doi:10.1525/aa.1988.90.2.02a00010. ISSN 0002-7294.
- Spaulding, Albert C. (1985). "Fifty years of theory". American Antiquity. 50 (2—Golden anniversary issue): 301–8. doi:10.2307/280488. ISSN 0002-7316. JSTOR 280488. S2CID 147025614.
- Spaulding, Albert C. (1962). Archaeological Investigations on Agattu, Aleutian Islands. Ann Arbor: Museum of Anthropology, University of Michigan. ISBN 9781949098273. OCLC 460418225.
- Spaulding, Albert C. (1960). "The dimensions of archaeology". In Gertrude E. Dole; Robert L. Carneiro (eds.). Essays in the science of culture in honor of Leslie A. White. New York: Crowell. pp. 437–56. [Reprinted in Man's imprint from the past: readings in the methods of archaeology, ed. James Deetz (Boston: Little, Brown, 1971), 23–39.] OCLC 490514.
- Spaulding, Albert C. (1960). Statistical description and comparison of artifact assemblages. Bobbs-Merrill reprint series in the social sciences. Indianapolis: Bobbs-Merrill. pp. 60–83. [Reprinted from "The Application of Quantitative Methods in Archaeology" by Heizer and Cook, 1960.] OCLC 29301183.
- Spaulding, Albert C. (1955). Prehistoric cultural development in the Eastern United States. Bobbs-Merrill reprint series in the social sciences. Indianapolis: Bobbs-Merrill. pp. 12–27. [Reprinted from "New Interpretations of Aboriginal American Culture History", 1955.] OCLC 28479692.
- Spaulding, Albert C. (1954). "Reply to Ford". American Antiquity. 19 (4): 391–393. doi:10.2307/277610. JSTOR 277610. S2CID 144656442.
- Spaulding, Albert C. (1953). "Statistical techniques for the discovery of artifact types". American Antiquity. 18 (4): 305–13. doi:10.2307/277099. ISSN 0002-7316. JSTOR 277099. S2CID 56633835.
- Spaulding, Albert C. (1946). Northeastern archaeology and general trends in the northern forest zone (Thesis). Columbia University, New York: Peabody Foundation for Archaeology. OCLC 715768116.
