= Mildred Mott Wedel =

American archaeologist and ethnologist (1912–1995)

- Born: Mildred Ingram Mott; September 7, 1912; Marengo, Iowa, US
- Died: September 4, 1995 (aged 82); Boulder, Colorado, US
- Spouse: Waldo Rudolph Wedel
- Father: Frank Luther Mott

Academic background
- Education: University of Iowa; University of Chicago
- Thesis: The Relation of Historic Indian Tribes to Archaeological Manifestations in Iowa

Academic work
- Discipline: archeology ethnohistory
- Main interests: Great Plains; Siouan people

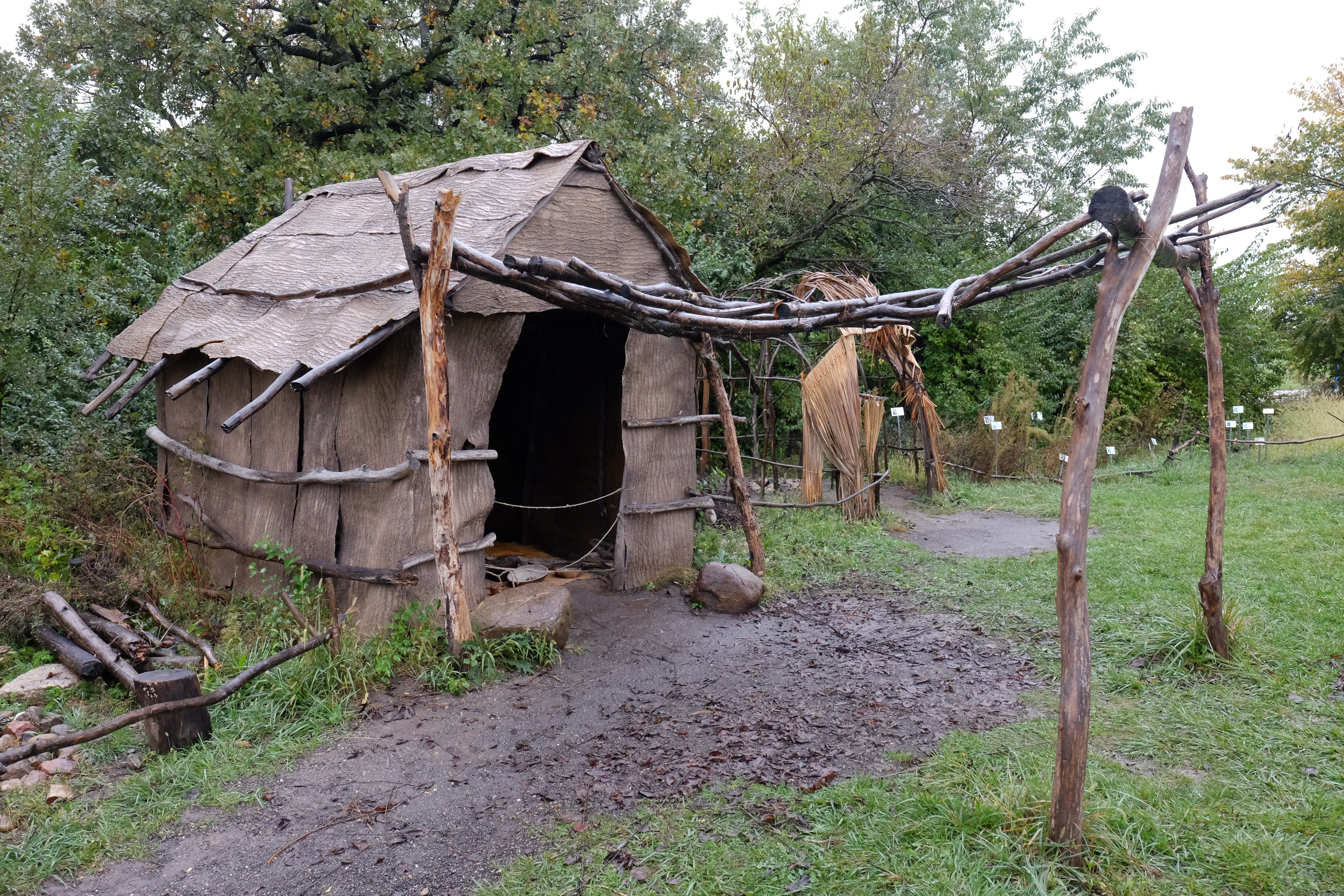
1700 Ioway Indian Farm at Living History Farms; Wedel had consulted on the design

Mildred Mott Wedel (née Mildred Ingram Mott; September 7, 1912 – September 4, 1995) was an American archeologist and ethnohistorian of the Great Plains. She was one of the first professionally trained female archaeologists and was distinguished in her field. Many of her publications were about the Siouan people, and wrote several important articles on French exploration in the Central and Southern Plains.

== Early life and education ==
Mildred Ingram Mott was born on September 7, 1912, in Marengo, Iowa, to parents Vera Ingram and Frank Luther Mott. Her father was a noted journalist and professor at State University of Iowa (now the University of Iowa).

She attended the University of Iowa and received a B.A. degree (1934) in history; followed by anthropology studies at the University of Chicago with Sara Julia Jones Tucker; and studies at the University of New Mexico's Jemez Field School in archaeology in the summer of 1935. In 1936, Wedel assisted Ellison Orr at the Hill Mound Group and at Bear Effigy Mound at Brazell's Island, Allamakee County, Iowa. She joined the University of Chicago Dendrochronology Lab in 1937 and 1938 to the Kincaid Mounds field expedition under Florence Hawley. Wedel received a M.A. degree (1938) from the University of Chicago, under Fay-Cooper Cole. Her thesis, "The Relation of Historic Indian Tribes to Archaeological Manifestations in Iowa" (1938) was the most complete-to-date study of Iowa archaeology and Iowa-based Native American tribes.

== Career ==
Wedel served as a field director at an excavation project attributed to the Woodland period near Webster City and the Boone River channel, under the supervision of Charles Reuben Keyes in June and July 1938.

On August 12, 1939, she married archaeologist Waldo Rudolph Wedel and together they had three children. At the time of their marriage, her husband was the assistant curator of archaeology at the United States National Museum (now the Smithsonian Institution). In the summer of 1940, the Wedels' worked together on an archaeological project in Kansas.

From 1945, after World War II, until the 1960s, she helped her husband with the Smithsonian Institution's salvage archaeological projects held primary in the Dakotas; and she took her educational experiences from Sara Jones Tucker and expanded it by focusing on her own ethnohistory research (which is an overlap between anthropology and history). She did extensive research on French exploration in the Central and Southern Plains, specifically Jean-Baptiste Bénard de la Harpe, Sieur de la Harpe, Pierre-Charles Le Sueur, Claude Charles Du Tisne, and Jean-Baptiste Trutdeau. She published on the origins of Plains Caddoan culture, and on the Iowa and Wichita people.

In 1951, the Wedel family (including their children) attended an excavation at the Cheyenne River Site in South Dakota. In the 1960s and 1970s, she worked as a consultant for the Ioway and Otoe people to help supplement their federal land lawsuits. Other consultant work was for the 1700 Ioway Indian Farm at Living History Farms, an open-air museum in Urbandale, Iowa. In 1974, she was hired as a research associate at the Smithsonian Institution.

== Awards and honors ==
In 1980, Wedel won the Keyes/Orr Award for Distinguished Service from the Iowa Archeological Society; and in 1992 she was awarded the Distinguished Service Award for lifetime achievement from the Plains Anthropological Society. In 1985, the American Anthropological Association's Committee on the Status of Women in Anthropology honored her. In 1988, there was a symposium at the Plains Conference in her dedication.

== Death and legacy ==
Wedel died on 4 September 1995 in Boulder, Colorado.

Wedel is one of the women featured in the Plaza of Heroines (1996) at Iowa State University in Ames, Iowa.

== Publications ==
- Hawley, Florence May; Wedel, Mildred Mott (1941). Tree-Ring Analysis and Dating in the Mississippi Drainage, Issue 2. University of Chicago Press.
- Wedel, Mildred Mott (1959). Oneota Sites on the Upper Iowa River. Volume 21, Issues 2-4 of The Missouri Archaeologist Series. Missouri Archaeological Society. ISBN 9780943414386.
- Wedel, Mildred Mott (1971). J.-B. Bénard, Sieur de la Harpe: Visitor to the Wichitas in 1719. Institute of the Great Plains.
- Wedel, Mildred Mott (1974). The Bénard de la Harpe Historiography on French Colonial Louisiana. Louisiana Studies Institute, Northwestern State University.
- Wedel, Mildred Mott (1978). La Harpe's 1719 Post on Red River and Nearby Caddo Settlements. Issue 30 of Bulletin of the Texas Memorial Museum. Texas Memorial Museum.
- Wedel, Mildred Mott (1978). A Synonymy of Names for the Ioway Indians. Iowa Archeological Society.
- Wedel, Mildred Mott; Blaine, Martha Royce; Moore, Gordon (1981). The Deer Creek Site, Oklahoma: A Wichita Village Sometimes Called Ferdinandina: an Ethnohistorian's View. Issue 5 of Series in Anthropology. Oklahoma City, OK: Oklahoma Historical Society.
- Wedel, Mildred Mott (1988). The Wichita Indians 1541–1750: Ethnohistorical Essays. Volume 38 of Reprints in Anthropology. J & L Reprint Company.

== See also ==
- Archaeology of the Americas
- List of archaeologists
- List of women anthropologists
