= William Duncan Strong =

American archaeologist and anthropologist

William Duncan Strong (1899–1962) was an American archaeologist and anthropologist noted for his application of the direct historical approach to the study of indigenous peoples of North and South America.

== Early life and education ==
Strong was born in Portland, Oregon.

He initially studied zoology, but he changed his focus to anthropology at the University of California, Berkeley, under the influence of Alfred L. Kroeber, who became his "principal teacher, mentor, and friend". Strong completed his doctorate in 1926.

== Career ==
Strong's doctoral dissertation, "An Analysis of Southwestern Society", was published in American Anthropologist. A related study of his, Aboriginal Society in Southern California, presenting his detailed fieldwork among the Serrano, Luiseño, Cupeño, and Cahuilla peoples, has been characterized as "one of the earliest and one of the best efforts by a United States anthropologist to combine structural-functional analysis with historical data and interpretation". Strong also conducted ethnographic field research among the Naskapi of Labrador.

Most of Strong's anthropological contributions were specifically in archaeology. His 1935 study, "An Introduction to Nebraska Archaeology", is credited with providing a major impetus for the direct historical approach in archaeology.

In the 1930s, Strong, Waldo Rudolph Wedel and A. T. Hill found archaeological evidence in Nebraska different from the prehistoric Central Plains and Woodland traditions. The evidence was attributed to a new culture called the Dismal River culture, or Dismal River aspect, for its location on the Dismal River basin of Nebraska, dated between 1650 and 1750.

Strong performed pioneering fieldwork in California's San Joaquin Valley, the Pacific Northwest, the American Great Plains, Labrador, and Honduras, where he sought the legendary La Ciudad Blanca. In Peru, he developed statistical methods to seriate pottery styles and is credited with the discovery of the tomb of the war god Ai apaec in 1946.

Strong held academic positions at the University of Nebraska and Columbia University. Among his notable students were the archaeologists Waldo Wedel and Gordon Willey.
