= Southeastern Archaeological Conference =

Professional association

Southeastern Archaeological Conference (SEAC)
- Established: May 1938; 88 years ago
- Founder: James Bennett Griffin and James A. Ford
- Region served: Southeastern United States, Eastern woodlands of the United States
- Website: https://www.southeasternarchaeology.org/

The Southeastern Archaeological Conference (SEAC) is a professional organization of archaeologists focused on the archaeology of the Southeastern United States and neighboring regions, from its earliest occupations to today. SEAC was important in the professionalization of archaeology in the Americas and publishes a large proportion of the archaeological work from the region and somewhat beyond. The organization puts on an annual conference hosted by a different city and different group of archaeologists every year, and it publishes a hybrid open-access biannual peer-reviewed journal, Southeastern Archaeology, published via Taylor & Francis. Since 2002, the Conference has had more than 1000 members and more than 450 attend the annual meeting.

Many researchers from the rest of the eastern woodlands, including the Midwest and to a lesser extent the Northeast are also members, because of the strong cultural relationships between the Woodland period and Mississippian period indigenous peoples across the region. As a result archaeologists working in the region around Cahokia Mounds and related sites outside of the Southeast proper are included in the conference.

The Conference hosts an annual student paper competition and gives out a variety of annual awards, including awards in honor of notable regional archaeologists Patty Jo Watson and Charles M. Hudson.

== History ==
In the 1930s, the pace of archaeology had rapidly increased in the eastern United States due to urban development, a growing number of professionals, and government-funded research activities associated with the widespread labor of the Civilian Conservation Corps and the growing Tennessee Valley Authority. James Bennett Griffin and James A. Ford organized the first Conference in order to organize the growing body of ceramic data created by this new outpouring of research. The first meeting was held May 16-17, 1938 in the Ceramic Repository at the University of Michigan, where Griffin was a professor. Notables at the meeting other than Ford and Griffin included David L. DeJarnette, Charles H. Fairbanks, Arthur Randolph Kelly, Preston Holder, and Thomas Lewis (husband of Madeline Kneberg Lewis), among others. This meeting was successful, leading to the formal founding of the organization and the development of a newsletter starting in 1939. A supplementary Bulletin began publication in 1964 that included conference proceedings, and eventually the biannual journal began publication in 1982.

The Conference played an enormous role in the history of the archaeology of the United States. Many of the 20th century methods of archaeology were innovated in the Southeastern United States by participants in the Conference, who experimented with them in the field in the region, and then discussed them and published them via the Conference. For example, Griffin's work on Fort Ancient was an early testing ground, in which methods associated with the later Culture History school of archaeology were applied at large scale and critiqued. Joffre Coe, who attended the first Conference, would bring these ideas to North Carolina during excavations at Town Creek Indian Mound and nearby. Similarly, the massive Works Progress Administration-associated University of Chicago excavations that occurred at Kincaid Mounds and other major sites in Illinois at the direction of Fay-Cooper Cole further developed and spread these techniques among SEAC members and across the Southeast, with these updated large-scale methods then commonly referred to as the Chicago Method. These and similar large-scale research projects across the region drove an interest in more comprehensive and scientific approaches, contributing to the development of processual archaeology.

== Abstracting and indexing ==
- JSTOR
- Southeastern Archaeology in libraries (WorldCat catalog)

The SCImago Journal Rank of Southeastern Archaeology is 0.268.
