= Pawnee Indian Museum State Historic Site =

- Pawnee Indian Village Site
- U.S. National Register of Historic Places
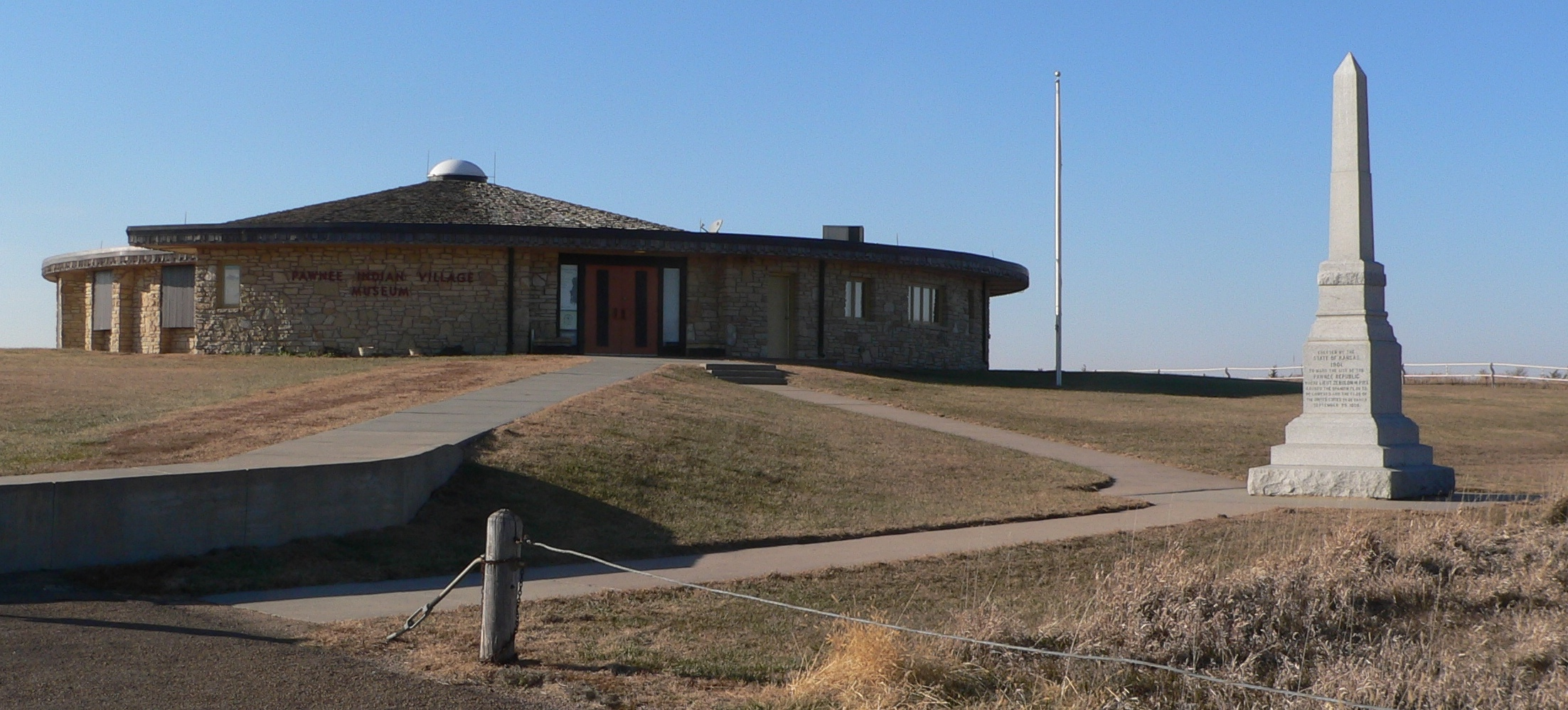
- Museum and restored 1901 monument

- Location within Kansas Location within the United States
- Nearest city: Republic, Kansas
- Coordinates: 39°54′30″N 97°51′38″W
- Area: 11.2 acres (4.5 ha)
- NRHP reference No.: 71000325
- Added to NRHP: May 14, 1971

The Pawnee Indian Museum State Historic Site, designated by the Smithsonian trinomial 14RP1, is an archaeological site and museum located near the city of Republic in the state of Kansas in the Midwestern United States. It is listed in the National Register of Historic Places under the name Pawnee Indian Village Site.

== Pawnee history ==
At the site are the remains of a village once occupied by the Kitkehahki, or Republican, band of the Pawnee tribe of Native Americans. It is one of four known Kitkehahki sites in the Republican River valley. The dates of occupation of this particular village are not known; the Kitkehahki intermittently occupied the Republican valley from the 1770s to the 1820s.

After the 1803 Louisiana Purchase, Spain and the United States disputed possession of the Louisiana Territory. Both nations sought allies among the Native American peoples of the territory, including the Pawnees. In 1806, Lieutenant Zebulon Pike led an expedition into the southwestern portions of the Territory. He visited a Pawnee village soon after the departure of a much larger Spanish expedition; there, he persuaded the inhabitants to haul down a Spanish flag and to replace it with that of the United States.

== Preservation and archaeology ==
In the 1870s, Elizabeth A. Johnson of Republic County became interested in Pike's flag episode. She discovered this site in 1875 and, after studying Pike's journals and investigating another reported Pawnee site in southern Nebraska, concluded that this was the village that Pike had visited. To protect the site from being plowed, she and her husband bought the land. In 1901, the Johnsons donated the site to the state of Kansas for historic preservation.

The state appropriated $3,000 to fence the land and build a 26-foot (7.9 m) granite monument commemorating the 1806 flag incident. At the 1901 dedication ceremony, several of the speakers drew parallels between Pike's symbolic triumph over Spain and the recent American victory in the Spanish–American War. In 1906, a four-day celebration was held to mark the centennial of the Pike episode.

Subsequent research showed that Pike's expedition had not visited this village, but the Kitkehahki village now known as the Pike-Pawnee Village Site, located on the Republican River in Webster County in south-central Nebraska. The error was a fortunate one, however: it led to the preservation of this site, whereas the Nebraska site had been degraded by years of cultivation.

Some archaeological investigation at the site was conducted in 1933, 1949, and 1957. Intensive investigation took place from 1965 to 1968. In 1967, a museum was constructed around one of the earth lodges prior to its excavation; the excavated lodge has been left open, with many artifacts in situ. The museum is operated by the Kansas Historical Society.

In 1971, the site was added to the National Register of Historic Places.

The 1901 monument at the site was damaged by a tornado in 2004. As a historically significant structure, it has been restored, but not to its original height and appearance.

== See also ==
- List of museums in Kansas
