= Direct historical approach =

Archaeological methodology seeking historical continuity

The direct historical approach to archaeology was a methodology developed in the United States of America during the 1920s-1930s by William Duncan Strong and others, which argued that knowledge relating to historical periods is extended back into earlier times. This methodology involves taking an archaeological site that has historical accounts relating to recent periods of occupation and then excavating it to establish continuity back into prehistoric times. The historical data then becomes the basis of analogy and homology for the study of the prehistoric communities at both the particular site and other sites in the region. The main issue with the approach is that in many parts of the world there is no direct continuity between historically documented communities and the prehistoric occupants of the region.

== Background ==
In the nineteenth century, the archaeological record of the Americas was viewed as an extension into the past of the ethnographically documented record. Human behaviors of the archaeological past were seen as nearly identical to those described ethnographically and thus, they could be studied with minimal training in archaeology. The result of this particular view was the development and regular use of what came to be known as the direct historical approach.

Roland B. Dixon was seen as an early proponent of this approach. In his presidential address to the American Anthropological Association he stated: “one would logically proceed to investigate a [number of sites of known ethnic affiliation], and work back from these,” because it “is only through the known that we can comprehend the unknown, only from a study of the present that we can understand the past.” Strong, who later became attributed to this particular methodology, argued that Dixon set forth the procedure of the direct historical approach. Strong would later go on to say that “once the archeological criteria of [a historically documented] culture had been determined, it [is] then possible to advance from the known and historic into the unknown and prehistoric.”

Oddly, the direct historical approach rarely appears in histories of American anthropology. Similarly, very few texts point out that the direct historical approach was used for three distinct purposes. In American archaeology these were: (1) to identify the cultural association of an archaeological manifestation; (2) to construct relative chronologies of archaeological materials; and (3) to understand the human behaviors that were thought to have produced particular portions of the archaeological record.

== The Direct Historical Approach as a Cultural Identifier ==
After the peak of the direct historical approach, Willey wrote about its use as a means of assigning ethnic identity to archaeological phenomena. He explained: “through a series of successive periods prehistoric cultures were linked to proto-historic, historic, and modern descendants. This type of study, sometimes called the ‘direct historical approach,’ has a theoretical basis in cultural continuity. Starting with known, documented habitation sites, certain cultural assemblages were identified and associated with particular tribal groups. Earlier archaeological assemblages were then sought which were not too sharply divergent from the known historic ones, and the procedure was followed backwards in time…The establishment of prehistoric-to-historic continuity is of utmost importance as a springboard for further archaeological interpretation, and, along with general chronological and distributive studies, it is one of the primary historical problems for the American archaeologist.”

Most famously, Cyrus Thomas used the reasoning of the direct historical approach to demonstrate that various earthworks scattered across the eastern and midwestern portions of America (mounds) were produced by the direct genetic and cultural ancestors of historically documented ethnic groups (the indigenous peoples of the Americas).

== The Direct Historical Approach in Establishing Chronology ==
In much the same way that the direct historical approach was used to demonstrate ancestor-descendant relationships, it was also used to measure the passage of time (also called chronology). This process involves creating time-based sequences of artifacts by starting with a list of cultural traits related to specific artifact types and then working into the past by determining which traits/artifact types were held by archaeologically represented cultures. Through this theoretical sorting, one can study more than ethnic identification by establishing time-based sequences. After ethnic identification and chronology has been established, the direct historical approach becomes the basis of analogy.

== Issues with the Direct Historical Approach ==
There are large parts of the world that are without direct continuity between historically documented communities and the prehistoric occupants of the region. Without this connection, the direct historical approach lacks purpose and is unable to enhance archaeological study. If this is the case, archaeologists rely on other archaeological theories and methods.
