= Dismal River =

River in Nebraska, U.S.

Coordinates: 41°49′30″N 100°04′31″W

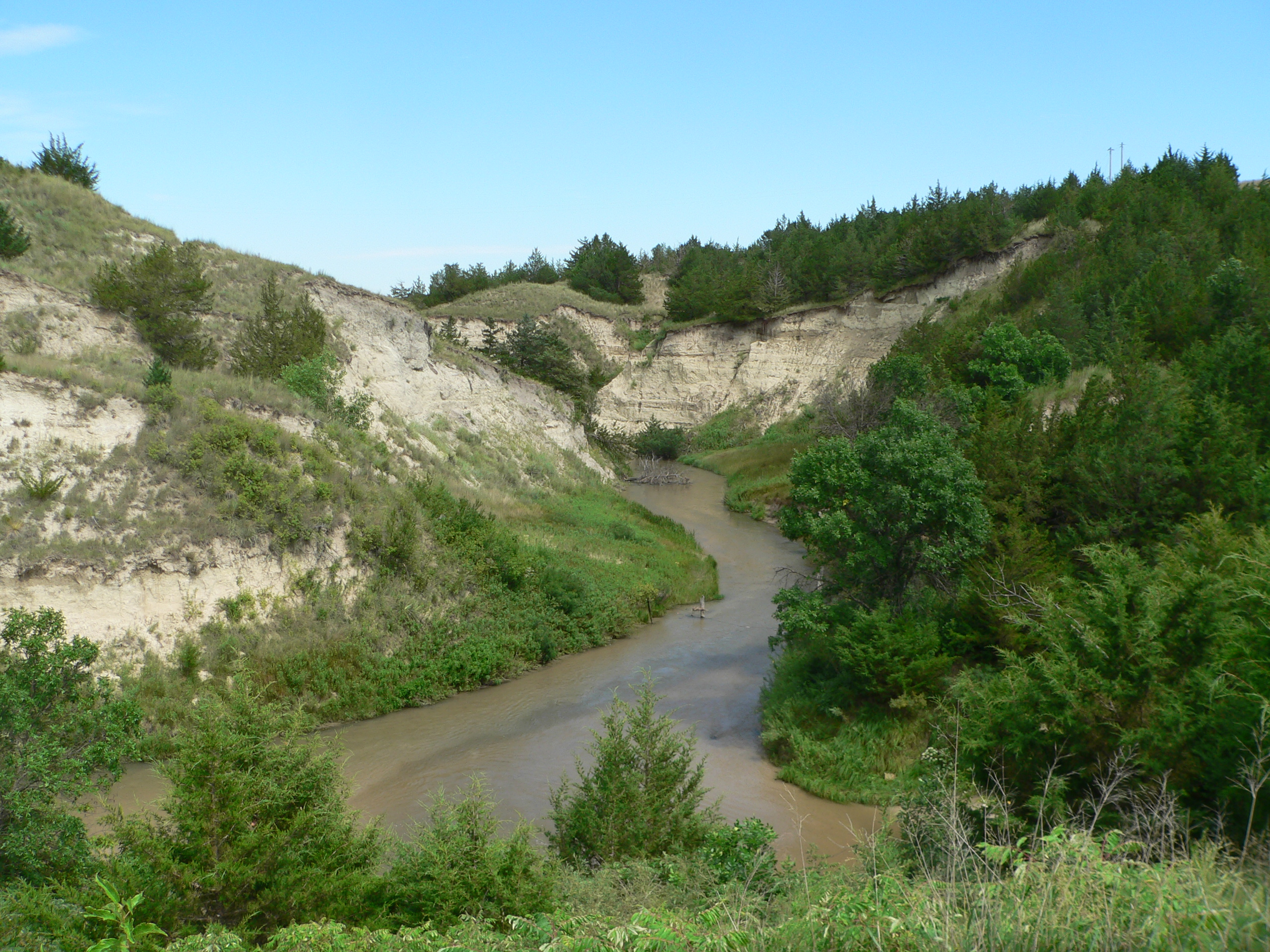
Looking downstream (east) from Nebraska Highway 97 crossing

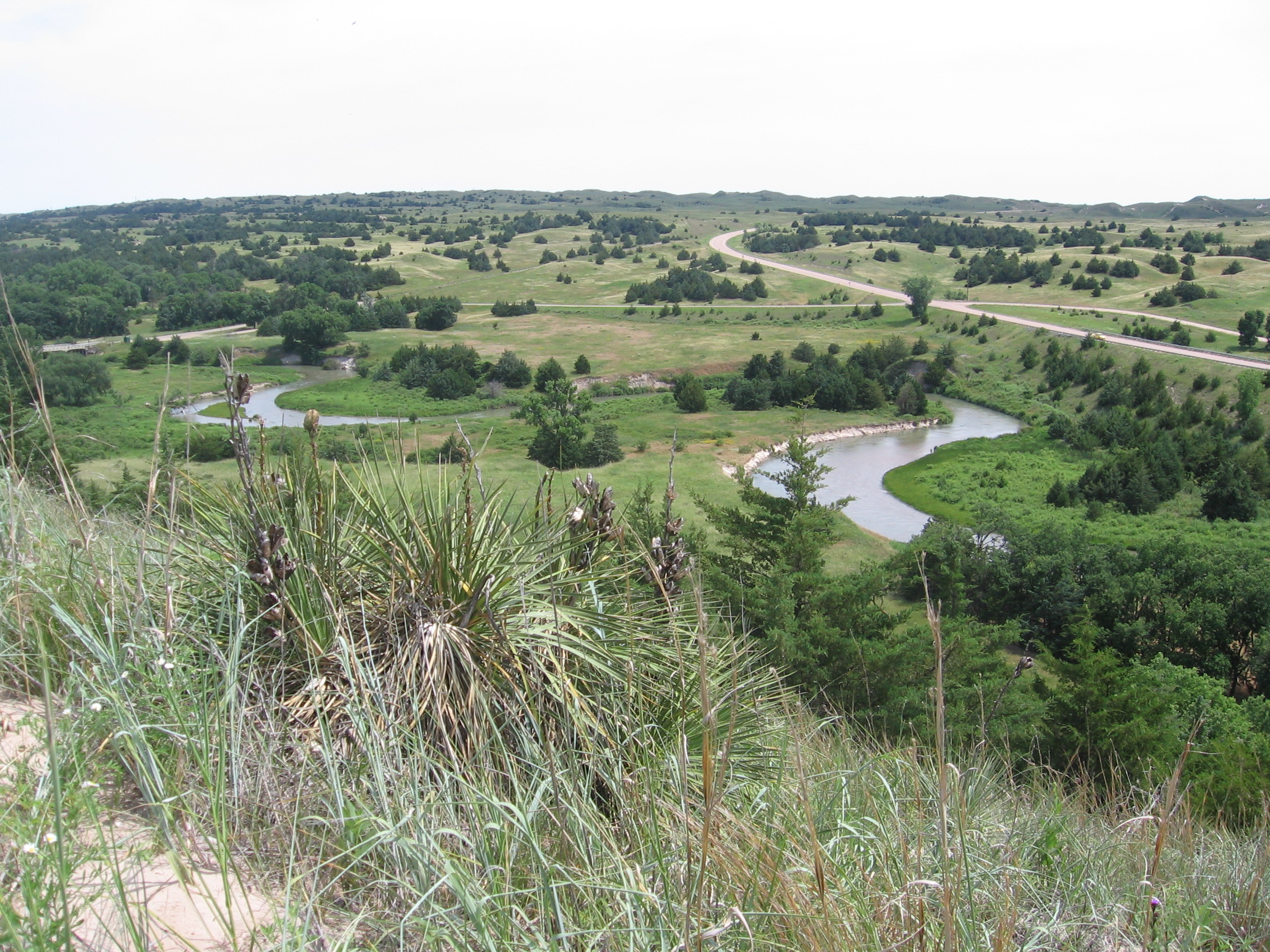
Dismal River, Sandhills, and U.S. Route 83 in Thomas County.

The Dismal River is a winding 71.9-mile-long (115.7 km) river in the state of Nebraska. It is formed by the confluence of two forks, one of which has its origins in Grant County and the other in Hooker County. The forks meet near Nebraska Highway 97 between Mullen and Tryon. From here the Dismal River flows east-southeast into Thomas County, crossing U.S. Highway 83 south of Thedford. Passing just south of the Nebraska National Forest (once the Dismal River National Forest), it turns slightly to the northeast before its confluence with the Middle Loup River just East of Dunning in Blaine County.

Most of the land along the river is privately owned and used for ranching. The water comes from the Ogallala Aquifer and boils up beneath the river in places, sometimes creating areas of quicksand. Deer, coyotes, beavers, turkey and rattlesnakes inhabit the area along the river.

Though much of the river's length is unpopulated, the Dismal River Golf Course, designed by Jack Nicklaus, borders it south of Mullen.

== Discharge ==
At Dunning, the Dismal has a mean annual discharge of 330 cubic feet per second (9.3 cubic metres per second).

== See also ==
- List of rivers of Nebraska
