= Prehistory of Colorado =

Coordinates: 38.9972°N 105.5478°W

Prehistory of Colorado provides an overview of the activities that occurred prior to Colorado's recorded history. Colorado experienced cataclysmic geological events over billions of years, which shaped the land and resulted in diverse ecosystems. The ecosystems included several ice ages, tropical oceans, and a massive volcanic eruption. Then, ancient layers of earth rose to become the Rocky Mountains.

Before humans, the dinosaur, mammoth, mastodon, camelops, and giant bison foraged for food in a verdant land. During the Ice Age summer, humans walked into the present Colorado area as they followed and hunted large animals.

The ancient hunters, the Paleo-Indians, evolved into modern Native American nations. The first people in Colorado were nomads, following and hunting large mammals using the Clovis point. As Megafauna became extinct, people adapted by hunting smaller animals, gathering wild plants, and cultivating food, such as maize. As the natives became more sedentary, there were significant technological and social advances, including basket, pottery, and tool making, and creation of permanent structures and communities. Trading with other indigenous people expanded the number and type of material items used for material goods, such as sea shells, stones for jewelry and tools, pottery and food.

== Origins ==
=== Geological formations ===
The following is a summary of geological formations in Colorado:

==== Precambrian igneous and metamorphic rocks ====
Precambrian metamorphic rock that forms the core of the North American continent during the Precambrian eon 4.5–1 billion years ago. There is also Precambrian sedimentary argillite, dating back to 1.7 billion years ago. During the Paleozoic, western North America lay underneath a shallow sea, which deposited many kilometers of limestone and dolomite.

==== Pikes Peak granite ====
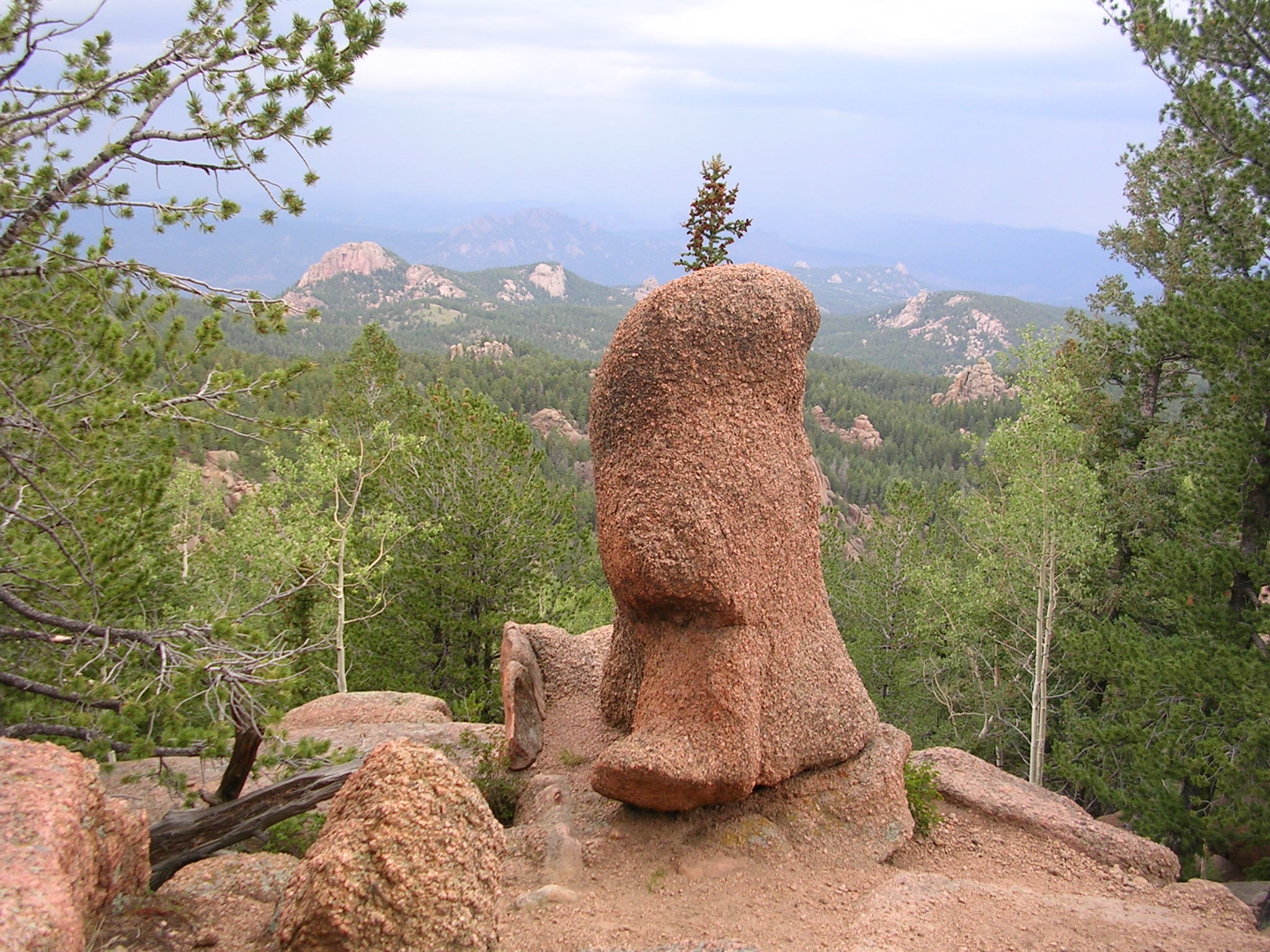

The Paleozoic era and during the Precambrian eon, about 300 million to one billion years ago, Pikes Peak Granite was formed from mass amounts of molten rock that would amalgamate, flow and combine, to form the continents. In Colorado it is known as the Precambrian Pikes Peak Granite. Over the next 500 million years, sedimentation (sediment deposition) occurred after the granite was produced. At about 500 to 300 million years ago, the region began to sink and lime and mud sediments deposited in the newly formed space. Eroded granite produced sand particles that formed strata, layers of sediment, in the sinking basin. At about 300 million years ago the land lifted, creating the ancestral Rocky Mountains.

===== Fountain Formation =====
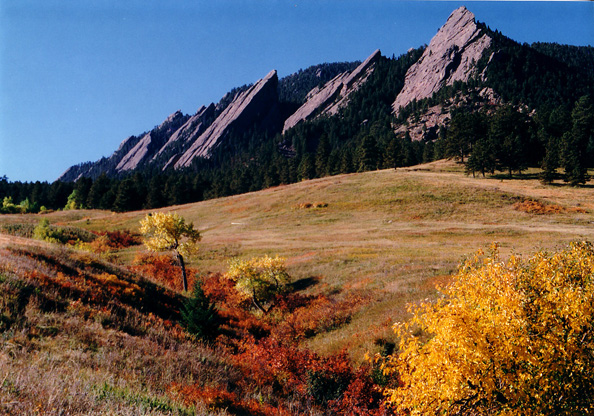

Fountain Formation was formed during the Pennsylvanian period of the Paleozoic era, 290-296 million years ago. Over the next 150 million years, during uplift the mountains would continue to erode and cover themselves in their own sediment. Wind, gravity, rainwater, snow, and ice-melt supplied rivers that ultimately carved through the granite mountains and eventually led to their end. Fountain Formation is Pennsylvanian bedrock unit consisting primarily of conglomerate, sandstone, or arkose, in Colorado and Wyoming, along the east side of the Front Range of the Rocky Mountains, and along the west edge of the Denver Basin. The characteristic predominant red color and the composition of the Fountain reflect that of the granites and gneisses from which it was eroded. Related sites are: Flatirons, Garden of the Gods, Red Rocks Park, Roxborough State Park

===== Lyons Formation =====
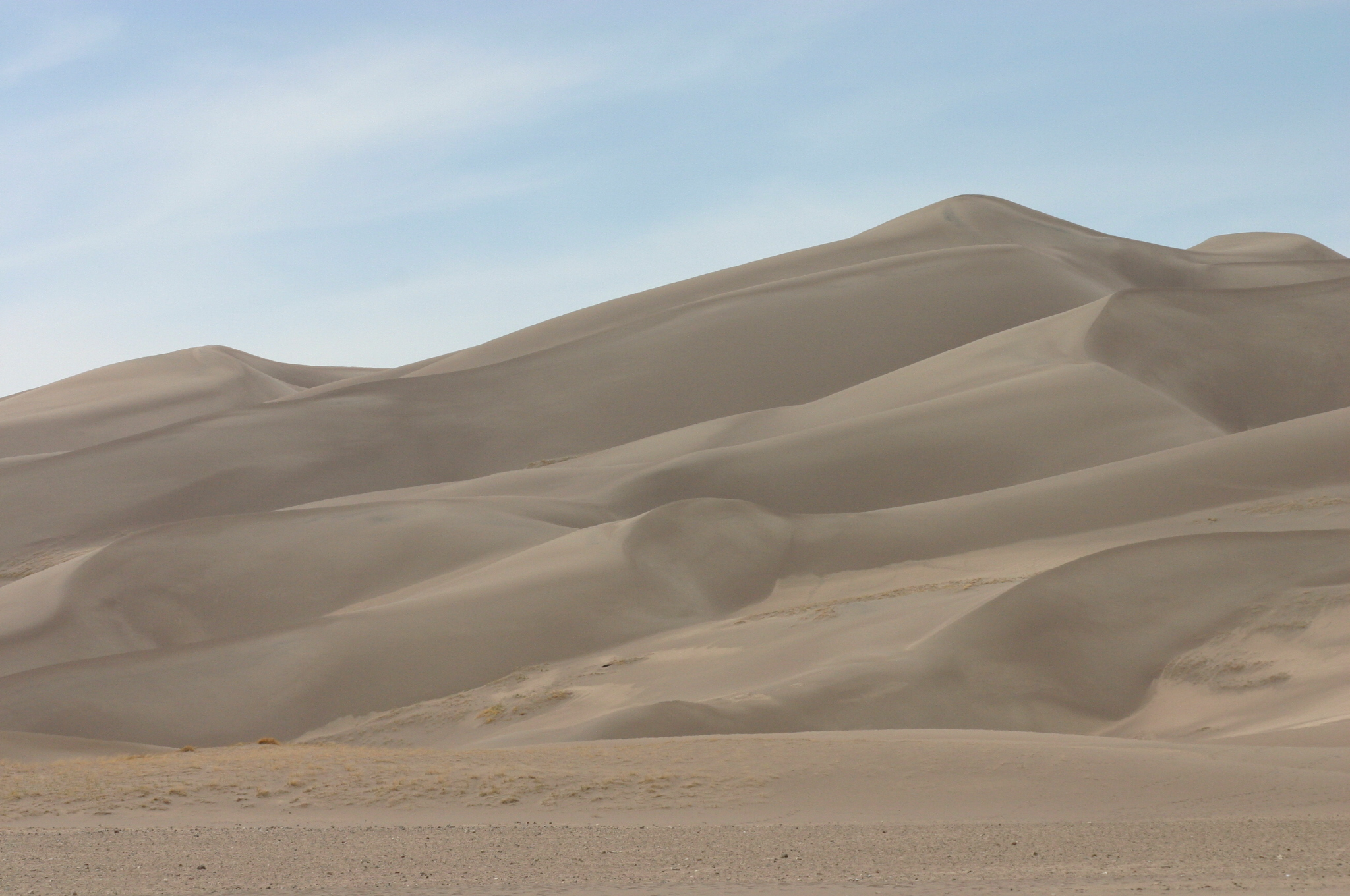

Lyons Sandstone was formed during the Permian period of the Paleozoic era, 250-280 million years ago. At the beginning of the period, sea levels were low and present-day Colorado was part of the super-continent Pangaea. Sand deserts covered most of the area spreading as dunes seen in the rock record, known today as the Lyons Sandstone. These dunes appear to be cross-bedded and show various fossil footprints and leaf imprints in many of the strata making up the section. Related sites include: Garden of the Gods, Roxborough State Park, and the Lyons and neighboring Hall Ranch Open Space areas.

===== Lykins Formation =====
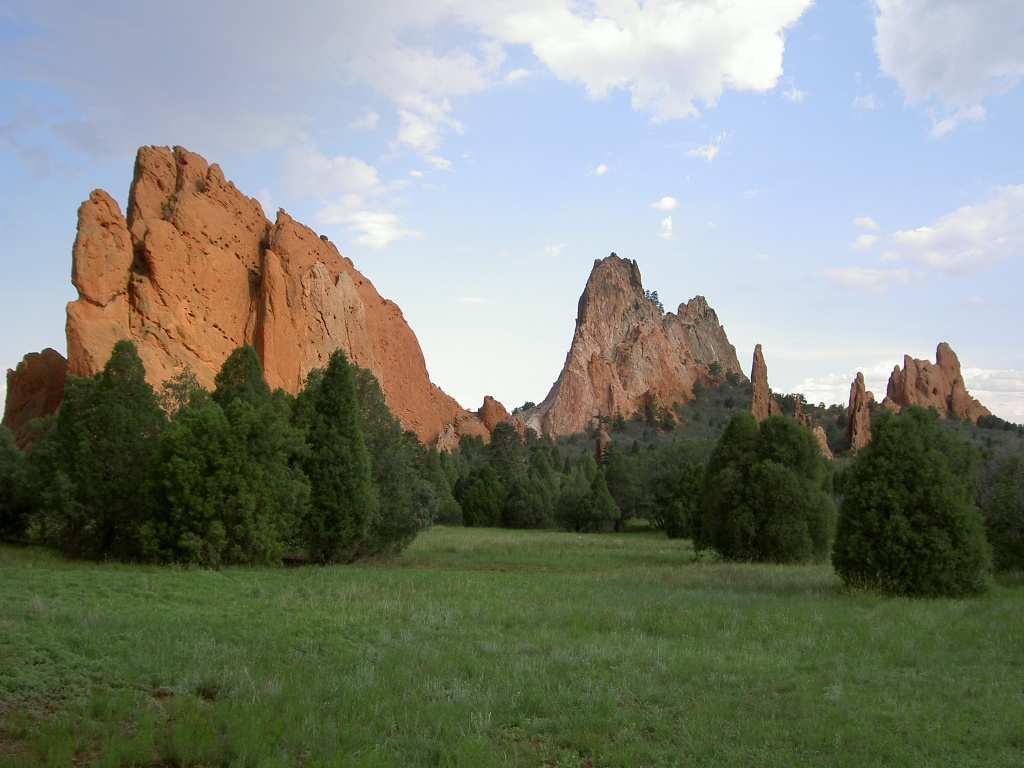

Lykins Formation was formed during the Jurassic and Triassic periods 150-250 million years ago. The sediment deposition of wavy layers of muddy limestone and signs of stromatolites that thrived in a smelly tidal flat at present-day Colorado. The Ancestral Rockies were burying themselves while the shoreline was present during the break-up of Pangaea. This formation began right after Earth's largest extinction 251 million years ago at the Permian-Triassic Boundary. Ninety percent of the planet's marine life was destroyed and a great deal on land as well. Related sites: Garden of the Gods, Red Rocks Park, Roxborough State Park

===== Morrison Formation =====
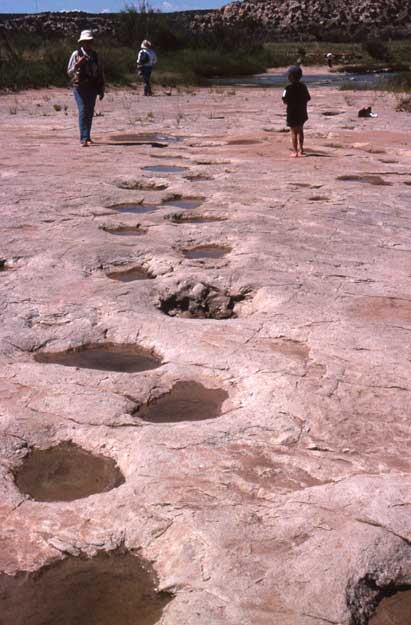

The Morrison Formation was formed during the Cretaceous and Jurassic Period 100-150 million years ago. The Morrison Formation contains some of the best fossils of the Late Jurassic. It is especially known for its sauropod tracks and sauropod bones among other dinosaur fossils. As identified by the fossil record, the environment was filled with various types of vegetation such as ferns and zamites. Related site: Dinosaur Ridge, the roadcut at the Interstate 70 Morrison exit

===== Dakota Sandstone =====
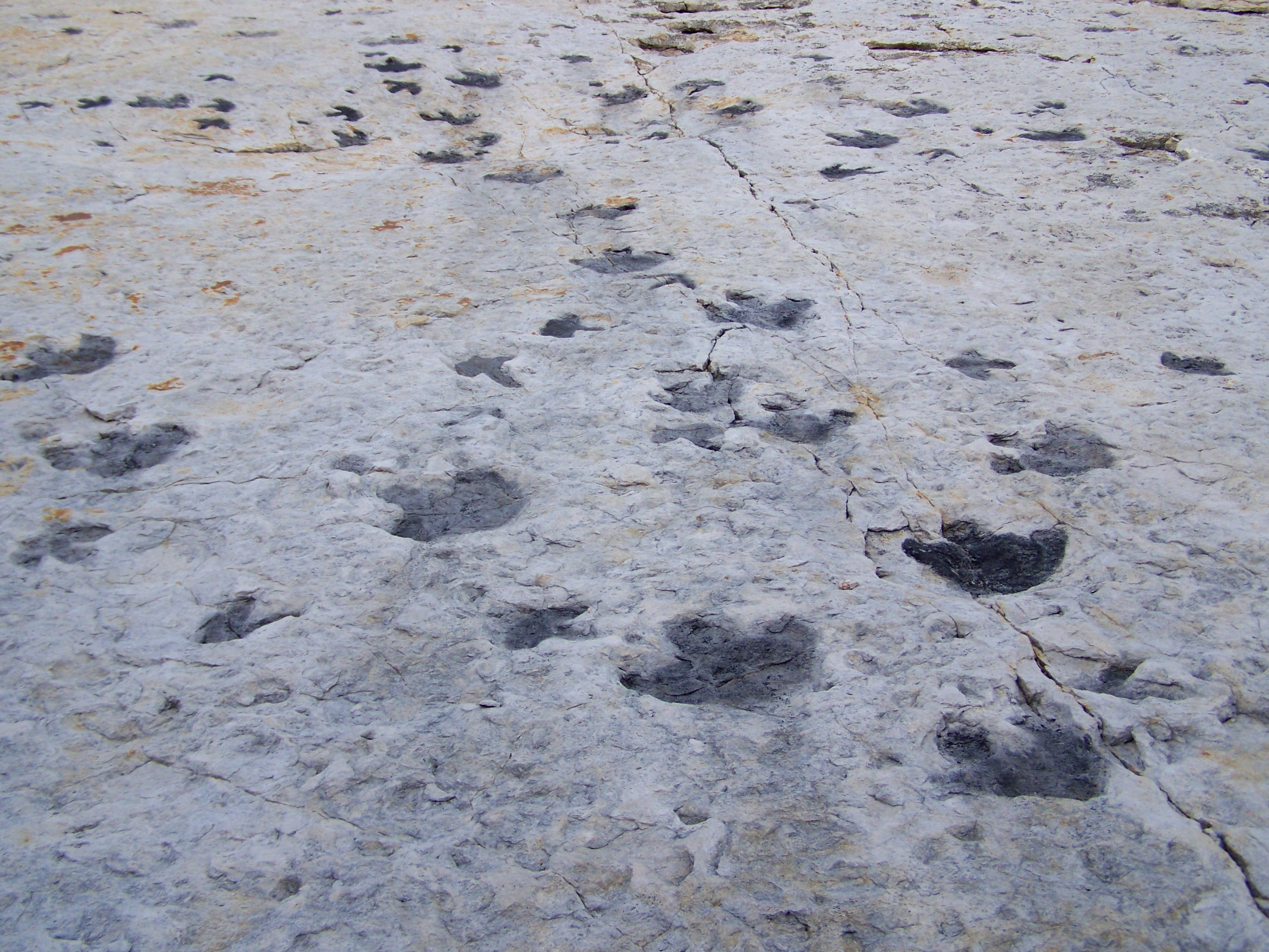

Dakota Sandstone, formed during the Cretaceous period 70 to 100 million years ago, was deposited 100 million years ago towards Colorado's eastern coast. It shows evidence of ferns, and dinosaur tracks. Sheets of ripple marks can be seen on some of the strata, confirming the shallow-sea environment. Related sites are: Dinosaur Ridge, Garden of the Gods, Roxborough State Park, Deer Creek Canyon Park, the roadcut at the Interstate 70 Morrison exit.

===== Pierre Shale =====
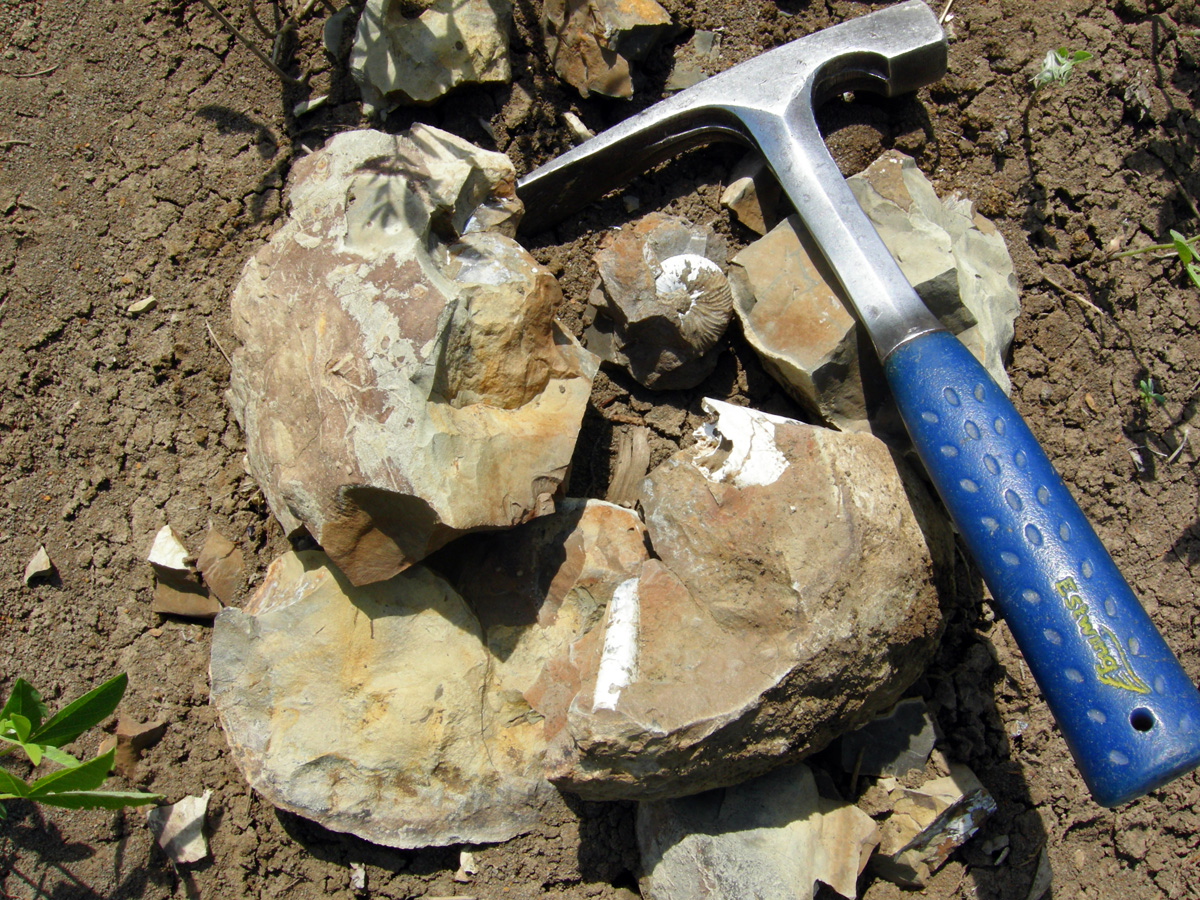

Pierre Shale was formed during the Paleogene and Cretaceous periods about 70 million years ago. The region was taken over by a deep sea, the Cretaceous Western Interior Seaway, and deposited mass amounts of shale over the area known as the Pierre Shale. Both the thick section of shale and the marine life fossils found (ammonites and skeletons of fish and such marine reptiles as mosasaurs, plesiosaurs, and extinct species of sea turtles, along with rare dinosaur and bird remains). Colorado eventually drained from being at the bottom of an ocean to land again, giving yield to another fossiliferous rock layer, the Denver Formation. At about 68 million years ago, the Front Range began to rise again due to the Laramide Orogeny in the west. Related sites are: Garden of the Gods, Fountain Creek Nature Center, Rooney Road near Dinosaur Ridge, Valmont Dike

===== Fox Hills Formation =====

Fox Hills Formation was formed during the Paleogene / Cretaceous periods. It is a marginal marine yellow sandstone with shale interbeds created with the receding Western Interior Seaway in Late Cretaceous time.

===== Laramie Formation =====
Laramie Formation, formed during the Cretaceous periods, is a geologic formation of the Denver Basin that ranges from 400 to 500 feet on the western side of the basin and 200–300 feet thick on the eastern side. The formation can be divided into a lower unnamed member containing bedded sandstone, clay, and coal and an upper unnamed member composed predominately of 90 to 190 m of drab-colored mudstone, some sandstone, and thin coal beds.

===== Denver Formation =====
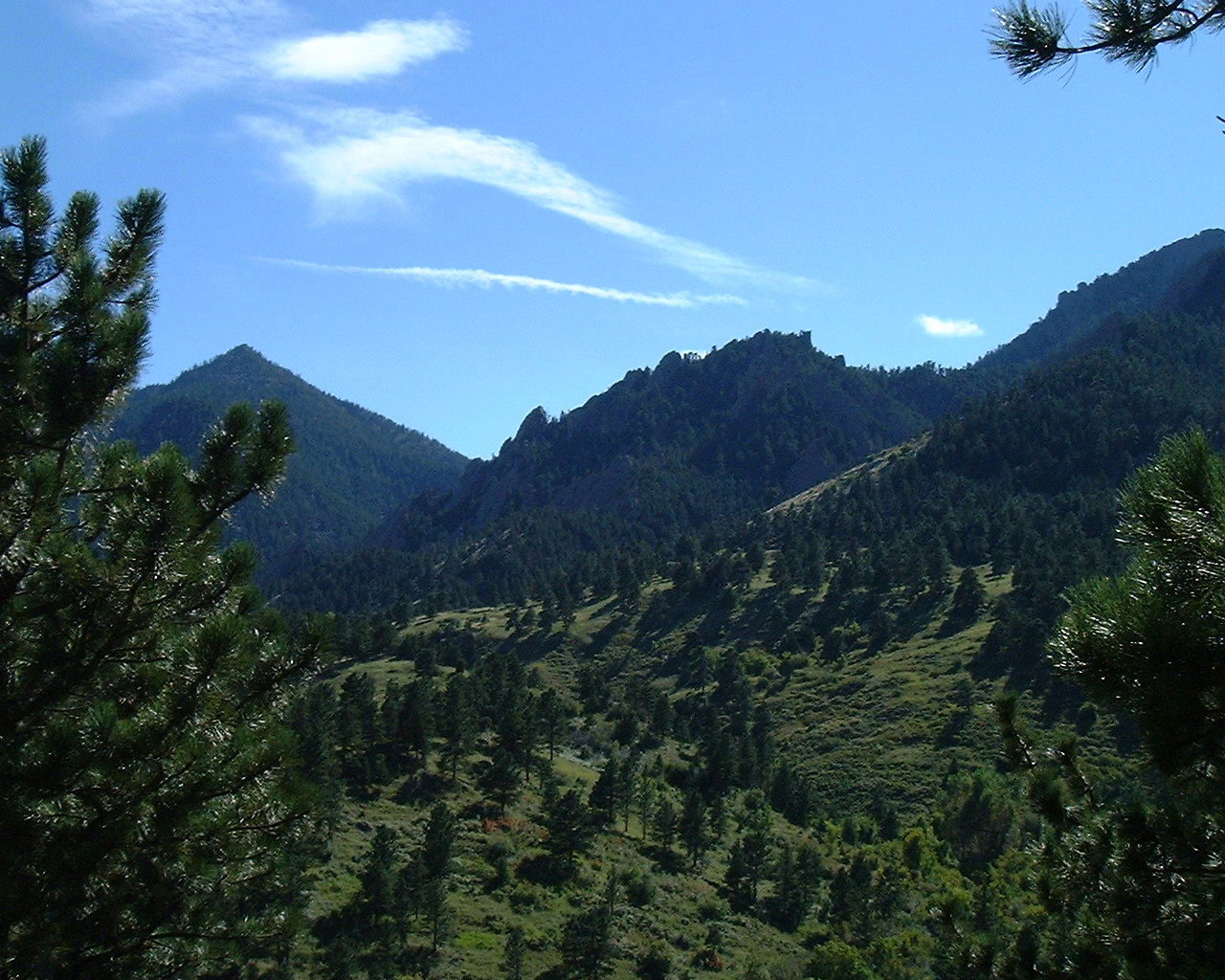

Denver Formation, formed during the Paleogene / Cretaceous periods 55 million years, contains fossils and bones from dinosaurs like Tyrannosaurus rex and Triceratops. While the forests of vegetation, dinosaurs, and other organisms thrived, their reign would come to an end at the Cretaceous–Paleogene boundary (K–T boundary). In an instant, millions of species are obliterated from a meteor impact in Mexico's Yucatan Peninsula. While this extinction lead to the dinosaurs' and other organisms' demise, some life did prevail to repopulate the earth as it recovered from this tremendous disaster. The uplifted Front Range continued to constantly erode and, by 40 million years ago, the range was once again buried in its own rubble. Related sites are: Austin Bluffs Park, Green Mountain, Palmer Park, Pulpit Rock Park, South Table Mountain

===== Paleosol – Dawson Arkose =====
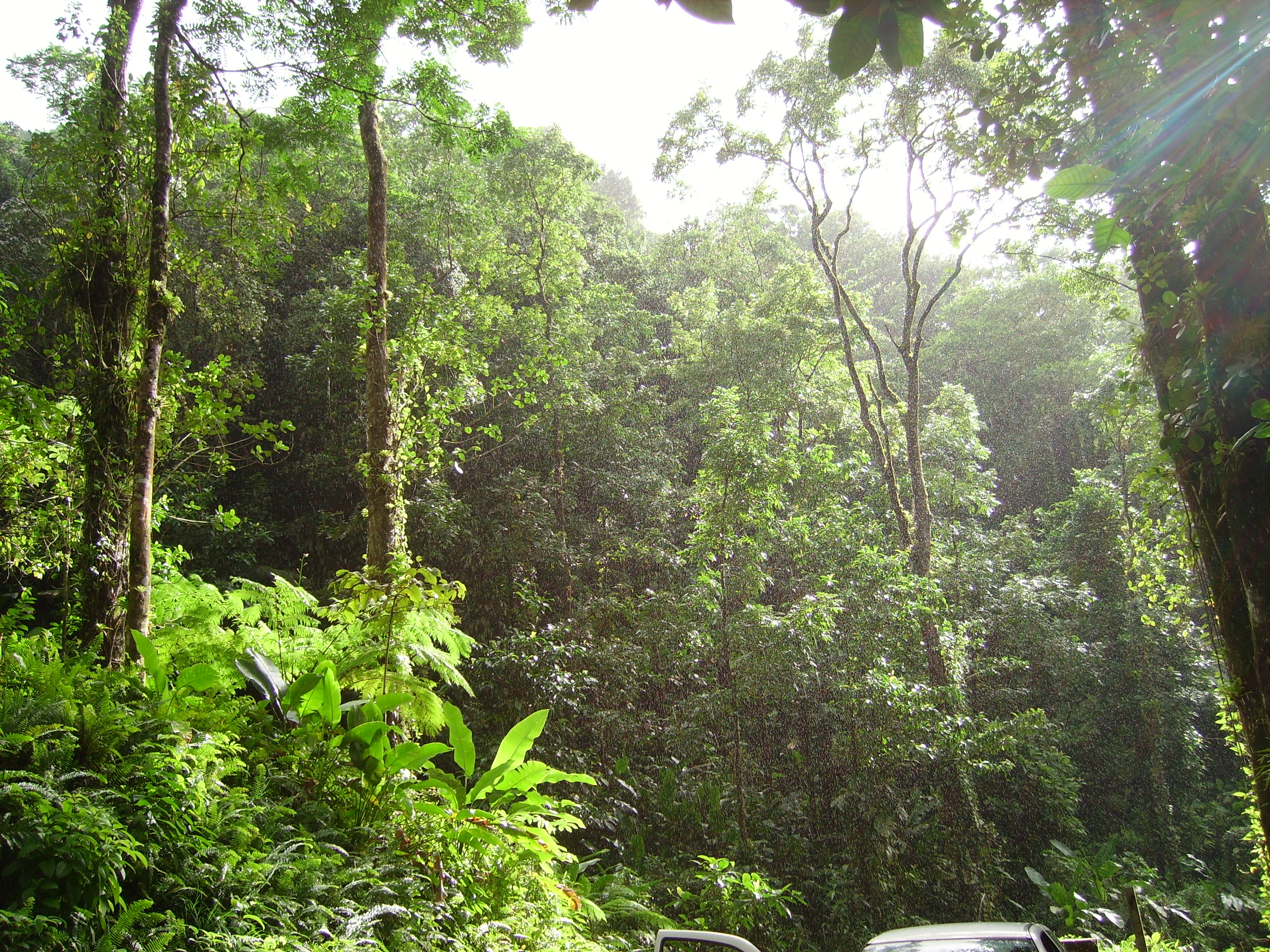

Dawson Arkose, formed during the Paleogene period 37-55 million years ago, is up to 20 foot thick, multi-colored layers of clay form in this prehistoric tropical forest. This layer, Paleosol, is a soil of fossils such as petrified wood. An uplift occurred on the Front Range that caused the Pikes Peak granite to become exposed and then erode on the surface, resulting in a white sandstone called Dawson Arkose. Related sites are: Castlewood Canyon State Park, Daniel's Park, Paint Mines Interpretive Park, Rock Park

===== Castle Rock rhyolite =====
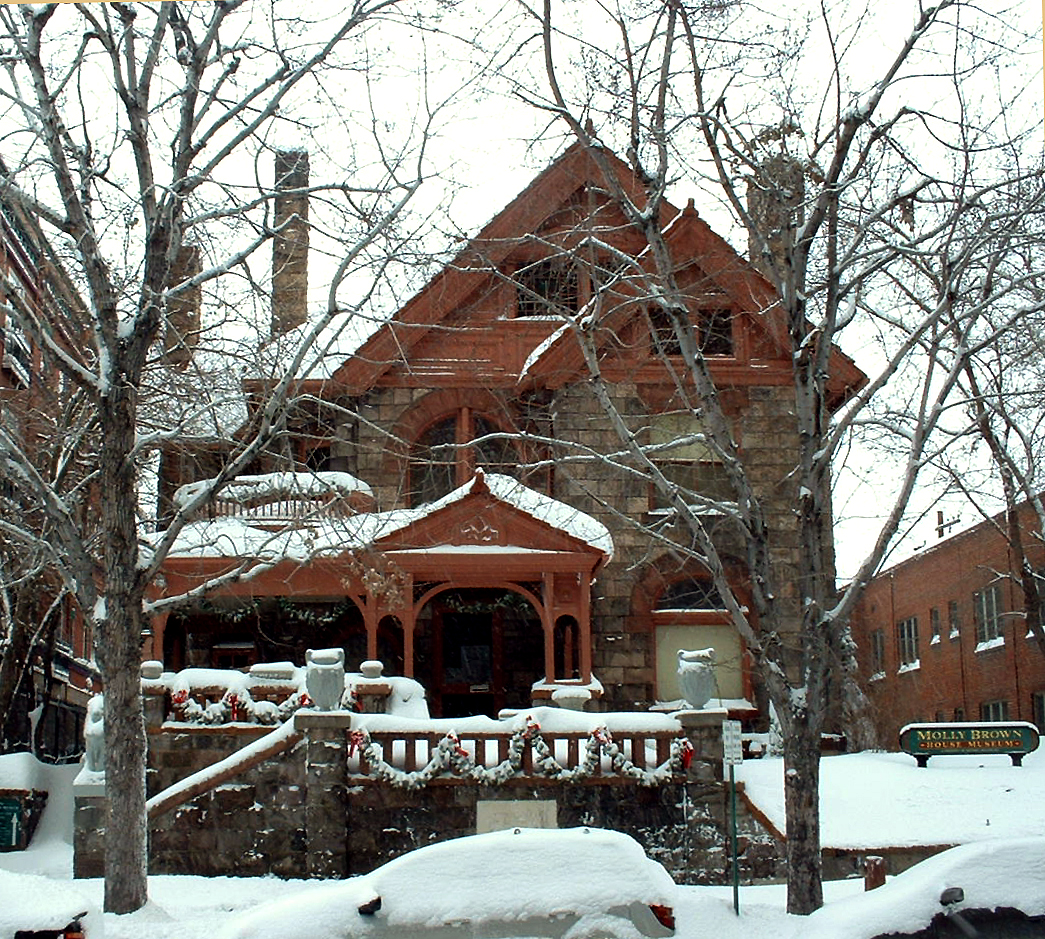

Castle Rock rhyolite was formed during the Paleogene period 34-37 million years ago. 37 million years ago, a great volcanic eruption took place in the Collegiate Range and covered the landscape in molten hot ash that instantly torched and consumed everything across the landscape. An entire lush environment was capped in a matter of minutes with 20 feet of extremely resistant rock, rhyolite. Related sites are: Castlewood Canyon State Park, Molly Brown House Museum, Rocks Park and mesa tops between Castle Rock and Monument Hill

===== White River Formation =====
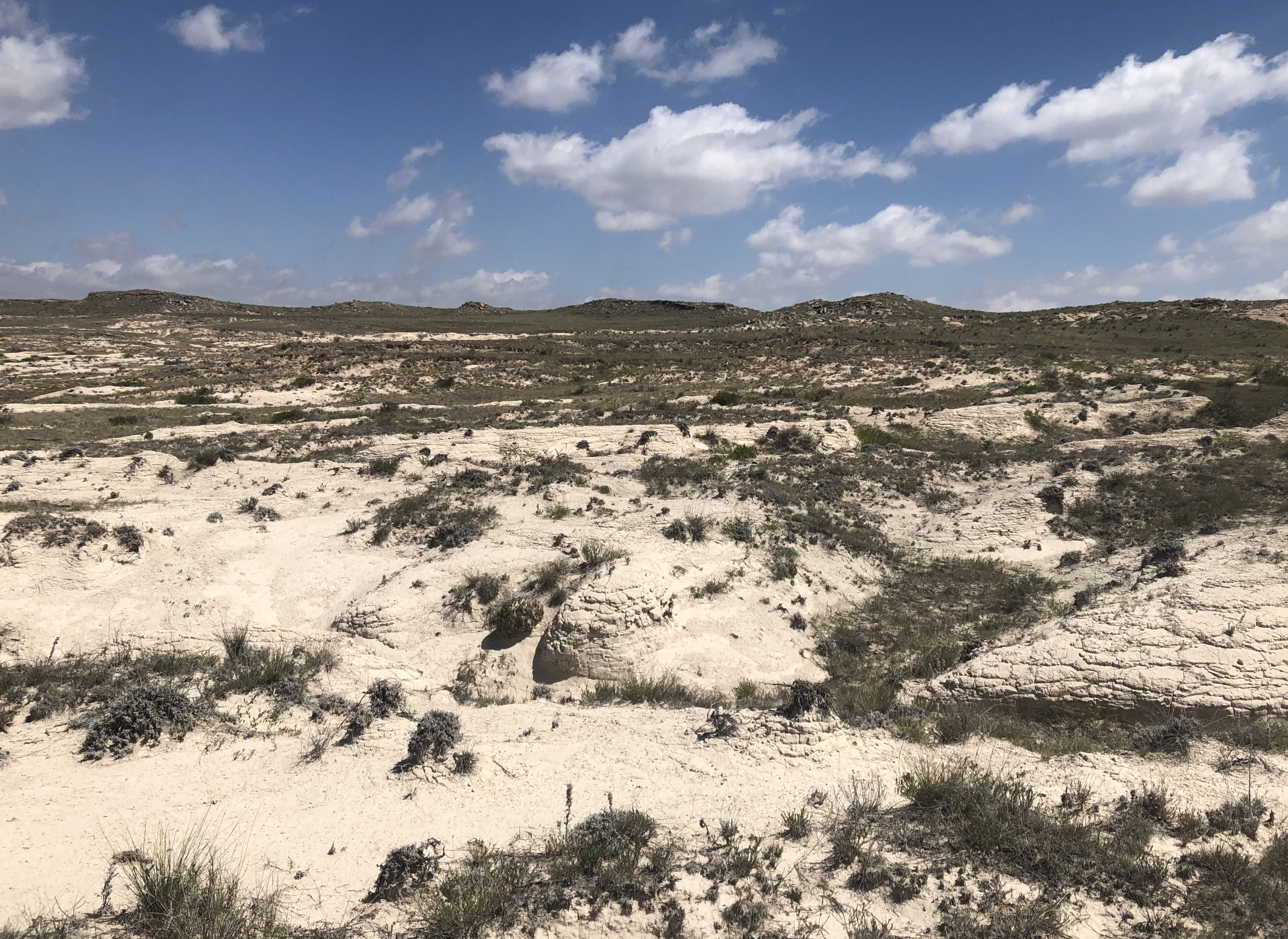
Sedimentary rock exposure of the White River Formation in Weld County, Colorado.

The White River Formation is found in the Northeastern corner of the Colorado, and was deposited between ~37.2 and ~30.8 Ma, encompassing parts of the late Eocene and early Oligocene. The formation is composed primarily of claystones, mudstones, and siltstones, within which a variety of fossil organisms, collectively referred to as the White River fauna, can be found. The fossil assemblage of the formation includes tortoises, alligators, predatory birds, Perissodactyls such as primitive horses and rhinoceroses, Entelodonts, Nimravids, rodents, Artiodactyls, and other mammals. The paleoenvironment of the formation has been interpreted as being composed of expansive savannah-woodlands and plains, occasionally interrupted by meandering rivers.

===== Castle Rock conglomerate =====
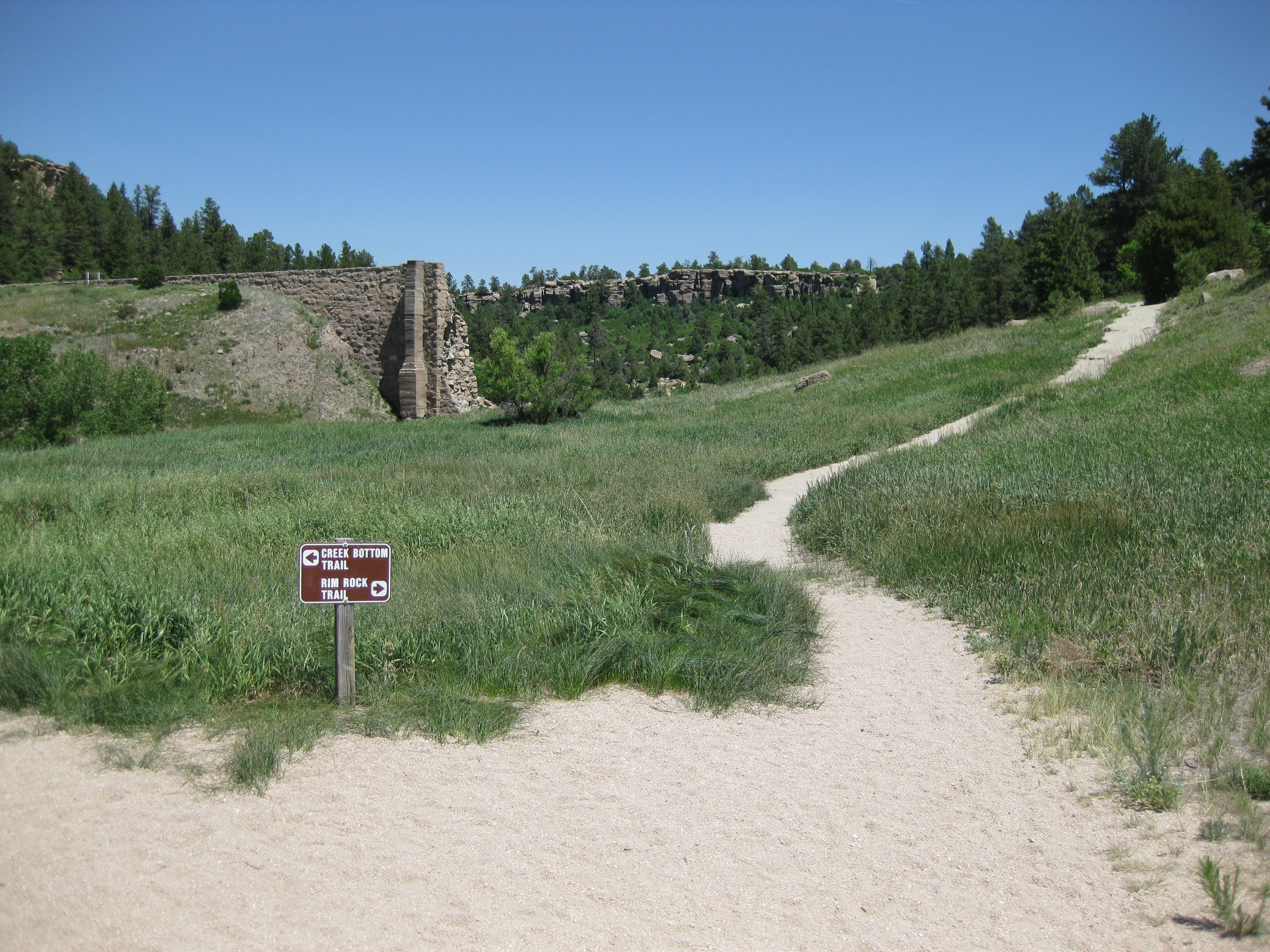

Castle Rock conglomerate was formed 16,000 – 34 million years ago. However, as seen before, life rebounds, and after a few million years mass floods cut through the rhyolite and eroded much of it as plants and animals began to recolonize the landscape. The mass flooding and erosion of the volcanic rock gave way to the Castle Rock Conglomerate that can be found in the Front Range. About 10 million years ago, the Front Range began to rise up again and the resistant granite in the heart of the mountains thrust upwards and stood tall, while the weaker sediments deposited above it eroded away. Related sites: Castlewood Canyon State Park, Rocks Park

===== Quaternary sediments =====
Quaternary Sediments were formed during the Pleistocene period, or Ice Age Summer, 11,000-16,000 years ago. As the Front Range rose, streams and recent (16,000 years ago) glaciations during the Quaternary age literally unburied the range by cutting through the weaker sediment, creating mesa tops and alluvial plains, and giving rise to the present Rocky Mountains. The receding glaciers and warming into an Ice Age summer created a climate suitable to camelops, mastodon, mammoth, bison antiquus and other megafauna. Related sites: Carson Nature Center, Highlands Ranch Open Space, Sand Creek Drainage, South Platte Park

=== Paleoclimatology ===
Paleoclimatology is the study of prehistoric weather. The Eemian interglacial period spanned 130,000–114,000 BP. The Laurentide Ice Sheet covered much of Canada and the northern United States from ca. 95,000 and ca. 20,000 years before present.

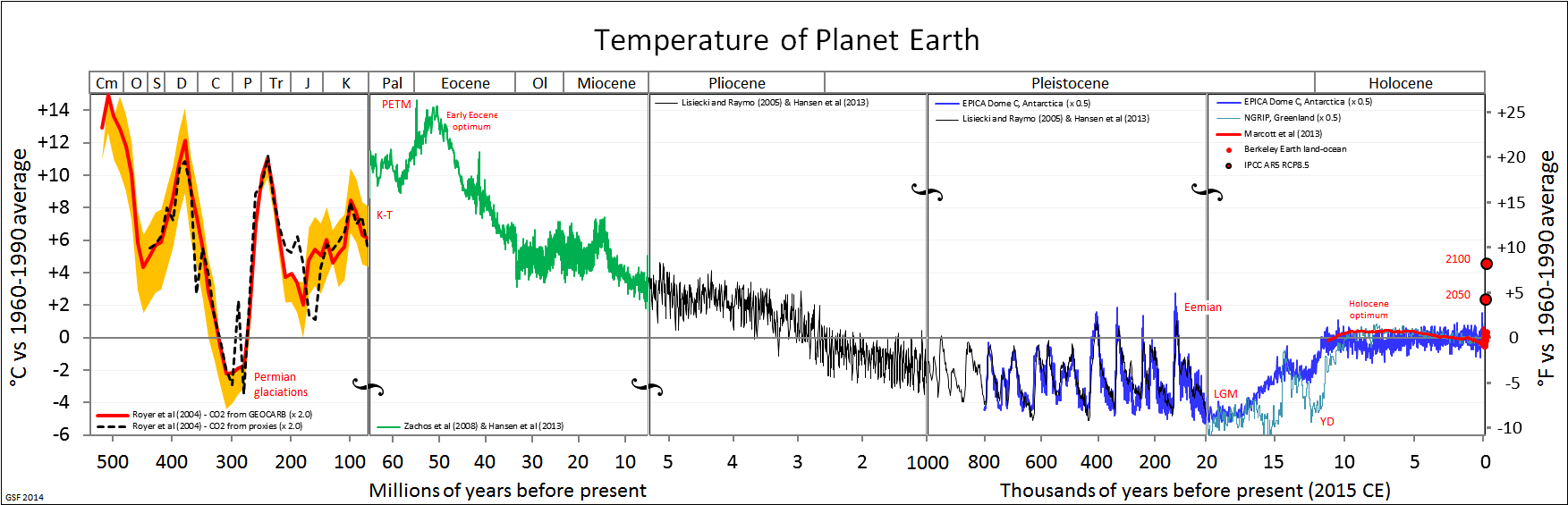

=== Ecosystems ===
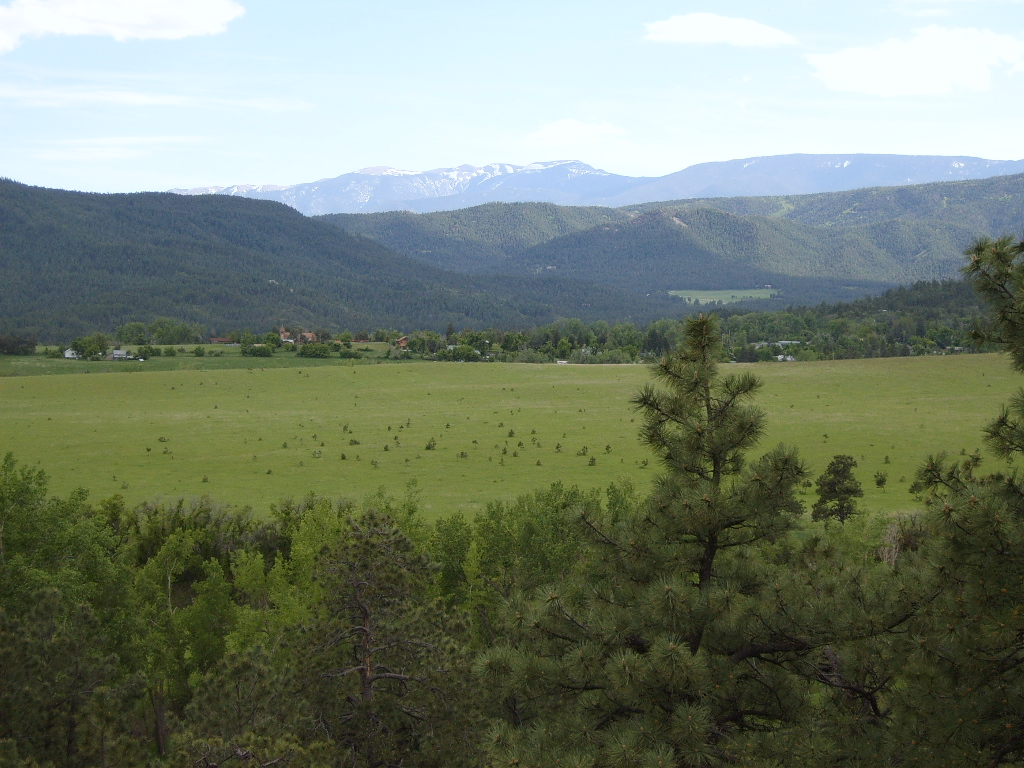
Beulah, Colorado – Montane grasslands

Colorado has one of the most diverse plant and animal environments of the United States, partially born from the dramatic temperature changes due to elevation changes and topography. The difference in elevation from the lowest ecosystems to the peaks of the Rocky Mountains is 12,000 feet. In dry climates, the average temperature drops 5.4 degrees Fahrenheit with every 1,000 foot increase in elevation (9.8 degrees Celsius per 1,000 meters). The mountains receive the most precipitation, which the lower altitude zones on the eastern and westernmost side of the state are semi-arid, receiving comparatively little precipitation.

The Denver Museum of Nature and Science developed an eight-zone classification of ecosystems, defined primarily by the most present dominant plant life:

- Grasslands
- Semidesert Shrubland
- Pinyon-Juniper Woodland (Pygmy forests)
- Riparian
- Montane Shrubland
- Montane Forest
- Subalpine Forest
- Treeline
- Alpine Tundra

Since the Precambrian eon, the land forms have lifted, receded and have been eroded; global temperature has vacillated from tropical to ice age, which significantly affected the number and type of ecosystems and what animal and plant life flourished during each geological period.

== Prehistoric people ==
=== Paleo-Indian period ===
The period immediately preceding the first humans coming into Colorado was the Ice Age Summer starting about 16,000 years ago. For the next five thousand years the landscape would change dramatically and most of the large animals would become extinct. Receding and melting glaciers created the Plum and Monument Creeks, the Castle Rock mesas and unburied the Rocky Mountains. Large mammals, such as the mastodon, mammoth, camels, giant sloths, cheetah, bison antiquus and horses roamed the land.

Sites for the early Paleo-Indian period are found on the plains (eastern half of the state), but later in the period, there are sites found in both the mountains and plains of Colorado.

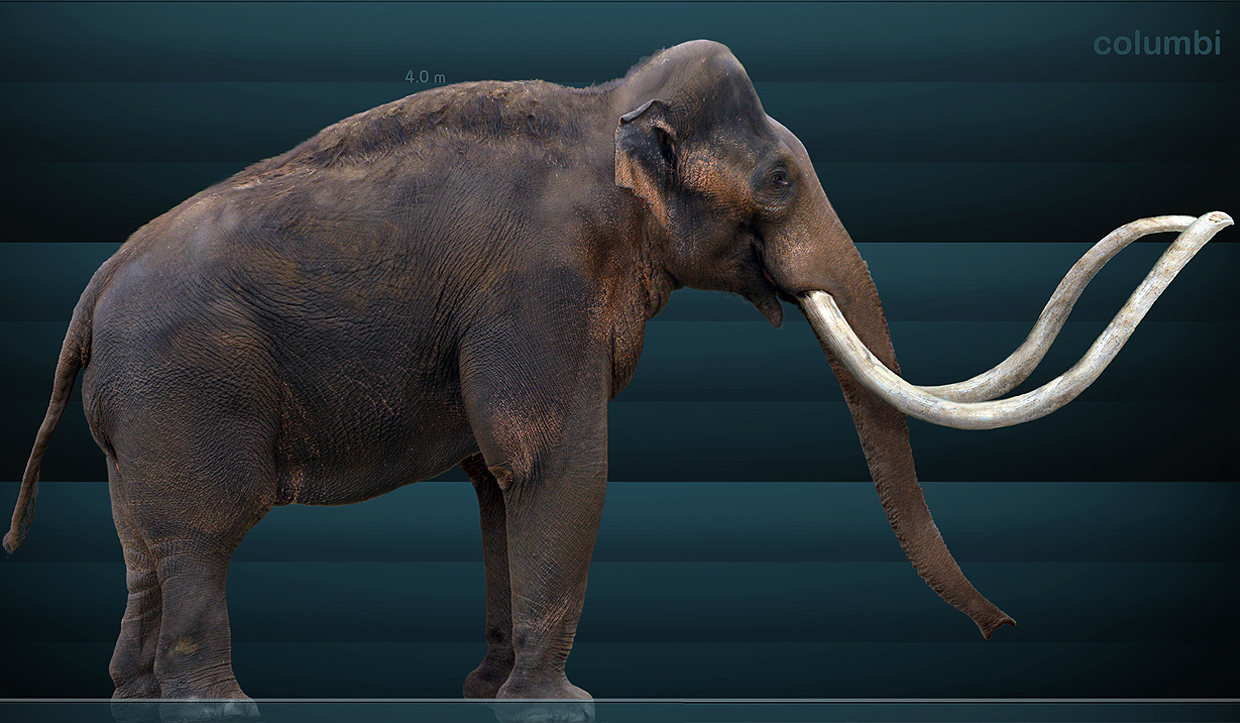
Restoration of a Columbian Mammoth

==== Pre-Clovis culture ====
Pre-Clovis period is defined by Paleo-Indian hunting before the use of Clovis points. An example is Lamb Spring in Littleton, with mammoth bones dated 14,140 to 12,140 years ago and hunting by use of stone tools other than Clovis points. Other examples include Dutton and Selby in the far eastern edge of Colorado.

==== Clovis culture ====
Some Paleo-Indian cultures were distinctive by the size of the tools they used and the animals they hunted. People in the first Clovis complex period had large tools to hunt the megafauna animals of the early Paleo-Indian period. A key Clovis culture site is the Dent site discovered in 1932 in Weld County, the first site to provide evidence that humans and mammoth co-existed, and that humans hunted mammoths on the North American continent (but see above).

A group of images by Eadweard Muybridge, set to motion to illustrate the movement of the bison

==== Folsom culture ====
With time, the climate warmed again and lakes and savannas receded. The land became drier, food became less abundant, and as a result many of the giant mammals became extinct. People adapted by hunting bison and smaller mammals and gathering wild plants to supplement their diet. A new cultural complex was born, the Folsom tradition, with smaller projectile points to hunt smaller animals. Aside from hunting smaller mammals, people adapted by gathering wild plants to supplement their diet. Examples of the Folsom tradition in Colorado are the Lindenmeier site, Olsen-Chubbuck Bison Kill Site and Jones-Miller Bison Kill Sites. Aside from other sites on the Plains, there are also Folsom sites in Middle Park and the San Luis Valley of Colorado.

==== Plano cultures ====
Plano cultures existed from about 10,000 to 7000 BC and are distinguished by their use of long, lanceolate and unfluted blades. Some of the best documented Plano sites are located in Colorado. Cody complex is a Plano culture that used unfluted projectile points and other tools like the Folsom and Clovis cultures from about 9000 to 7000 BC. Olsen-Chubbuck Bison Kill Site, Jurgens Site and Lamb Spring are Cody complex sites. Hell Gap complex, also a Plano culture, from 10,060 to 9600 before present (roughly 8050 to 7590 BC) was named for the Hell Gap, Wyoming archaeological site. It is distinguished by its long stemmed, convex and unfluted Hell Gap points. Jones-Miller Bison Kill Site is the only Hell Gap location in Colorado.

Other Paleo-Indian sites are Roxborough State Park Archaeological District and, with artifacts from the Goshen complex, Plainview complex, Phillips-Williams Fork Reservoir Site.

=== Archaic period ===
The Archaic period began about 7,000 years ago. Bison antiquus had become extinct, like the other megafauna, and people became reliant on smaller game, such as deer, pronghorns, and rabbits, and gathering wild plants. Their tool kits became larger, with greater reliance on manos and metates to grind food and changes in weapons for hunting, such as notched projectile points. They used plant fibers to make cordage, nets or traps to catch small animals and baskets to gather food.

The people moved seasonally to hunting and gathering sites. They lived in rock shelters, such as south-facing shelters that were warm in the winter and cool in the summer, and open-air campsites. Archaic people roamed the plains and the mountains, although hunting and gathering sufficient food to feed the band of people was more difficult in the higher-altitude ecological climates. Late in the Archaic period, about 200 to 500, maize was introduced into the diet and pottery-making became an occupation for storing and carrying food.

==== Apex complex ====
The Apex complex is a cultural tradition of the Middle Archaic period, distinguished by Apex projectile points dated from about 3000 to 500 BCE. The type site is the Magic Mountain site near Apex Creek. The Irwins, archaeologists at Magic Mountain, believe that the artifacts are from the Archaic–Early and Early Basketmaker II periods of the Ancestral Puebloans of Oasisamerica.

==== Archaic–Early Basketmaker period ====
The Archaic–Early Basketmaker period (7000–1500 BCE) was a cultural period of ancestors to the Ancestral Puebloans, represented in Colorado only in the southwestern part of the state. They were distinguished from other Archaic people of the Southwest by their basketry, which was used to gather and store food. They became reliant on wild seeds, grasses, nuts and fruit for food and changed their movement patterns and lifestyle by maximizing the edible wild food and small game within a geographical region. Manos and metates began to be used to process seeds and nuts. With the extinction of megafauna, hunters adapted their tools, using spears with smaller projectile points and then atlatl and darts. They lived in simple dwellings made of wood, brush and earth.

==== Mount Albion complex ====
The Mount Albion complex was an early Archaic culture (about 4050 to 3050 BCE) distinguished by the Mount Albion corner-notched projectile. It is the best-known early Archaic culture in Colorado. Hungry Whistler Site, a kill and butchering site, at 11,500 feet (3,500 m) is the type site dated from about 3850 to 3060 BC. LoDaisKa site, Magic Mountain site, Franktown Cave and Mount Albion are examples of the Mount Albion complex.

Examples of Archaic sites are Colorado Millennial Site, Franktown Cave, LoDaisKa site, Magic Mountain site, Picture Canyon, Roxborough State Park Archaeological District, and Trinchera Cave Archeological District.

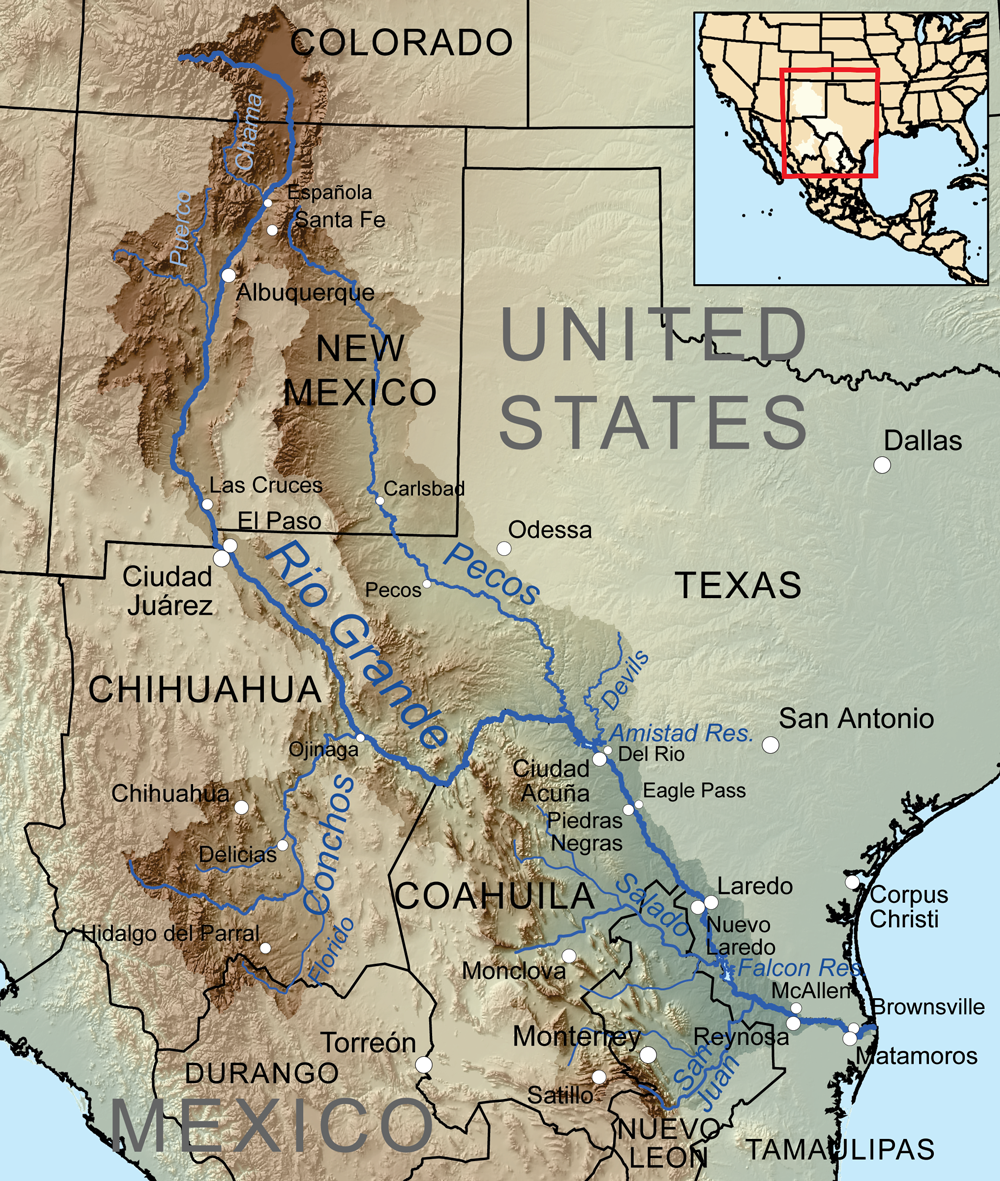
The Rio Grande region

=== Post-Archaic ===
==== Hunter-gatherer cultures ====
===== Apishapa phase =====
Apishapa phase (ca. 1000-1400) was first identified in the Lower Apishapa canyon and is distinguished by stone or slab constructed structures, cord-wrapped pottery and small projectile points. They were a tradition of hunter gatherers who sometimes farmed and lived in northern New Mexico or southern Colorado in rockshelters, single or multi-room stone or slab structures or in campsites. There are at least 68 Apishapa sites on the Chaquaqua Plateau in southeastern Colorado. Some sites where Apishapa archaeological evidence has been found include Franktown Cave, Picture Canyon and Trinchera Cave Archeological District.

===== Dismal River culture =====
The Dismal River culture was first seen in the Dismal River area of Nebraska. Dated between 1650 and 1750, it is different than other prehistoric Great Plains and Woodland traditions. The people were hunter-gatherers who also cultivated food and had a distinctive pottery style. Dismal River villages often had 15-20 round dwellings roughly 25 feet (7.6 m) in diameter. Plains Apache were linked to the culture. Some Colorado sites include Cedar Point Village and Franktown Cave

===== Panhandle culture =====
Panhandle culture (AD 1200 to 1400) is a culture of the southern High Plains, primarily located in the panhandle and west central Oklahoma and the northern half of the Texas Panhandle. Most of the sites are centered around the Canadian River or its tributaries, primarily Antelope Creek and also Cottonwood Creek, Dixon Creek, Tarbox Creek and also on the Archie King Ranch. Distinguishing characteristics of the Panhandle culture are: great similarity to the Central Plains complexes; some evidence of trading or influence of Southwestern pueblo cultures; and single or multi-roomed stone structures. For Colorado sites, see Trinchera Cave Archeological District as well as the Apishapa culture and Sopris phase articles.

===== Sopris phase =====
Sopris phase (AD 1000 to 1250) was first found in southeastern Colorado, near the present town of Trinidad. Although the culture appeared to have been greatly influenced by pueblo people, such as the Taos Pueblo and trade in the Upper Rio Grande, the Sopris culture was generally a hunter-gatherer tradition. See Trinchera Cave Archeological District

===== Plains Woodland =====
The Plains Woodland period, or Ceramic period, began in the Plains about AD 1 with the defining distinction of the creation of cordwrapped pottery, development of settlement areas, and use of smaller projectile points for hunting smaller game or bow and arrow technology. Sites include Colorado Millennial Site, Franktown Cave, LoDaisKa site, Magic Mountain site, Picture Canyon, and Roxborough State Park Archaeological District

==== Basketmaker and Ancient Puebloan people (southwestern Colorado) ====
===== Early Basketmaker II =====
The Early Basketmaker II period (1500 BCE to 50 CE) was the first post-Archaic cultural period of the Ancient Puebloans. The era began with the cultivation of maize in the northern part of Oasisamerica, although there was not a dependence upon agriculture until about 500 BCE.

They were named "Basketmakers" for their skill in making baskets for storing food, covering with pitch to heat water, and using to toast seeds and nuts. They wove bags, sandals, and belts out of yucca plants and leaves, and strung beads. They occasionally lived in dry caves where they dug pits and lined with stones to store food.

===== Late Basketmaker II =====
During the Late Basketmaker II period (50 to 500), people living in the Four Corners region were introduced to maize and basketry through Mesoamerican trading. Able to have greater control of their diet through cultivation, the hunter-gatherers' lifestyle became more sedentary as small, dispersed groups began cultivating maize and squash. They also continued to hunt and gather wild plants.

===== Basketmaker III =====
The Basketmaker III period (500 to 750) resulted in the introduction of pottery which reduced the number of baskets that they made and eliminated the creation of woven bags. The simple, gray pottery allowed them a better tool for cooking and storage. Beans were added to the cultivated diet. Bows and arrows made hunting easier and thus the acquisition of hides for clothing. Turkey feathers were woven into blankets and robes. On the rim of Mesa Verde, small groups built pit houses, which were built several feet below the surface, with elements suggestive of the introduction of celebration rituals.

===== Pueblo I =====
Pueblo buildings were built during the Pueblo I period (750 to 900) with stone, wooden posts, and adobe. The buildings were located more closely together and reflected deepening religious celebration. Towers were built near kivas and likely used for look-outs. Pottery became more versatile, not just for cooking, but now included pitchers, ladles, bowls, jars and dishware for food and drink. White pottery with black designs emerged, the pigments coming from plants. Water management and conservation techniques, including the use of reservoirs and silt-retaining dams, also emerged during this period.

===== Pueblo II =====
During the Pueblo II period (900 to 1150), there was an increase in population that resulted in the creation of more than 10,000 sites in 150 years. Since much of the land was arid, the people supplemented their diet by hunting, foraging and trading pottery for food. By the end of the period, there were two-story dwellings made primarily of stone masonry, the presence of towers, and family and community kivas.

===== Pueblo III =====
Rohn and Ferguson, authors of Puebloan ruins of the Southwest, state that during the Pueblo III period (1150 to 1300), there was a significant community change. Moving in from dispersed farmsteads into community centers at pueblos canyon heads or cliff dwellings on canyon shelves. Population peaked between 1200 and 1250 to more than 20,000 in the Mesa Verde region. By 1300 Ancient Pueblo People abandoned their settlements, as the result of climate changes and food shortage, and migrated south to villages in Arizona and New Mexico, where people lived through the Pueblo IV period and the Pueblo V period, the latter including the life of current Pueblo peoples.

=== Late prehistoric Native Americans ===
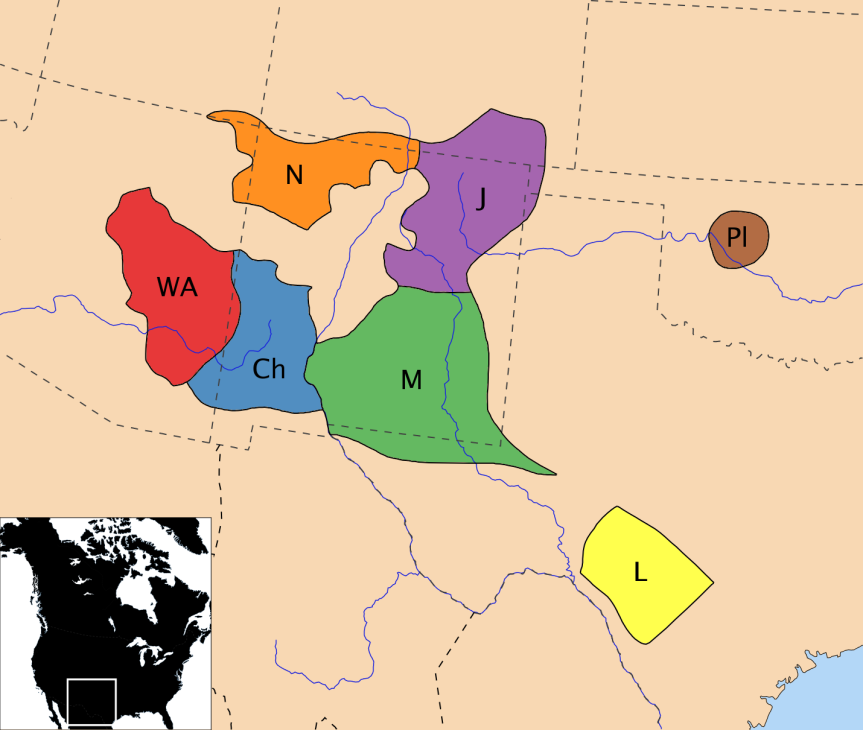
Apachean tribes ca. 18th century: WA – Western Apache, N – Navajo, Ch – Chiricahua, M – Mescalero, J – Jicarilla, L – Lipan, Pl – Plains Apache

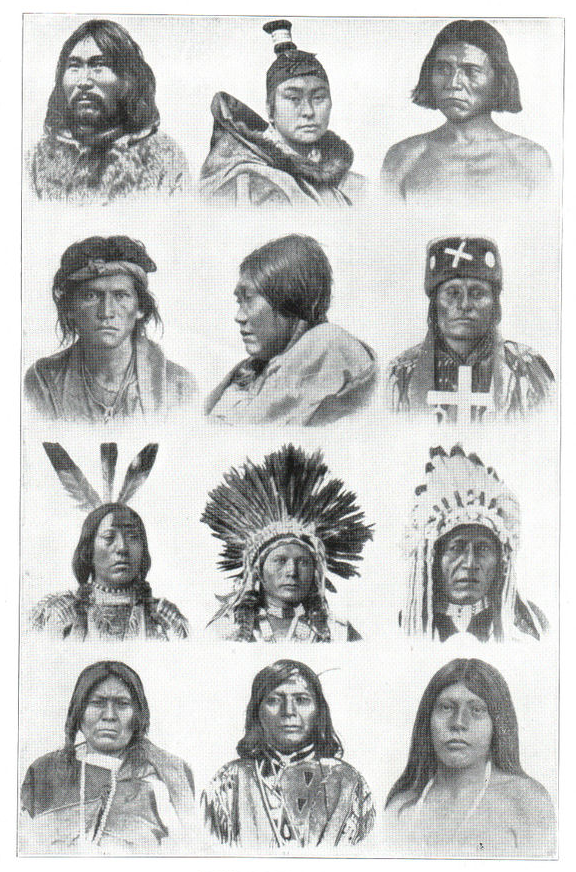
Natives of North (1st row) America Inuit of Labrador, Inuit woman of Greenland, Apache, (2nd row) Navajo, Koskimo woman of Vancouver, Cheyenne, (3rd row) Mandan, Ute, Blackfoot, (4th row) Woman Moki chief, Nez Percé, Wichita woman

After AD 1300, hunter-gatherers, ancestors of the Ute and Navajo, moved into the southwestern Colorado and southeastern Utah and came to inhabit the region. The Ute arrived in Colorado by the 1600s and occupied much of the present state of Colorado. They were followed by the Comanches from the south in the 1700s, and then the Arapaho and Cheyenne from the plains who then dominated the plains of Colorado. The Cheyenne, Arapaho and Comanche were the largest group of indigenous people in Colorado at the time of contact with settlers.

==== Native American people ====
===== Apache =====
The Apache presence in Colorado includes the Jicarilla Apache and Dismal River cultures. The Jicarilla Apaches are one of the Athabaskan linguistic groups that migrated out of Canada, by 1525 CE, and lived in what they then considered their land bounded by four sacred Rivers in northern New Mexico and southern Colorado: the Rio Grande, Pecos River, Arkansas River, and the Canadian River containing sacred mountain peaks and ranges. They also ranged out into the plains of northwestern Texas and the western portions of Oklahoma and Kansas. The Jicarilla Apache were hunter-gatherers, hunting primarily buffalo through the 17th century and thereafter added smaller game to their diet. Women gathered berries, agave, honey, onions, potatoes, nuts and seeds. Some bands practiced seasonal agriculture along the upper Arkansas River, cultivating squash, beans, pumpkins, melons, peas, wheat, and corn.

===== Arapaho =====
It is unclear how and when the Arapaho entered the Great Plains, they most likely lived in Minnesota and North Dakota before entering the Plains. Before European expansion into the area, the Arapahos were living on the plains in South Dakota, Nebraska, Colorado, Wyoming, and Kansas. They were close allies of the Cheyenne. In winter, the tribe split up into camps sheltered in the foothills of the Rocky Mountains in present-day Colorado. In late spring they moved out onto the Plains into large camps to hunt buffalo gathering for the birthing season. In mid-summer Arapahos traveled into the Parks region of Colorado to hunt mountain herds, returning onto the Plains in late summer to autumn for ceremonies and for collective hunts of herds gathering for the rutting season.

===== Cheyenne =====
The Cheyenne arrived in the Colorado area shortly after the Arapaho, spoke both of the Algonquian languages, lived on the plains east of the Rocky Mountains with the Arapaho. The Cheyenne and Arapaho banded together against the Comanche, Kiowa, Shoshone and Ute.

===== Comanche =====
The Comanche arrived in the Colorado area from the Great Basin and northern plains. They spoke a Shoshone language and by the time of contact with settlers were located in southeastern Colorado, south of the Arkansas River. To the north of the river were the Arapaho and Cheyenne. Allied with the Ute, they fought against the Apache. Their limited archaeological artifacts include a flat-bottomed pottery known as Intermountain tradition or Shooshonean pottery, like the ceramics found at Graever Cave and Roberts Buffalo Jump.

===== Navajo =====
The ancestors to the Navajo were one of the tribes of the southern division of the Athabaskan language family that migrated south from Alaska and northwestern Canada, most likely traveling through the Great Basin. The Navajo ancestors were in the area after AD 1300, but at least by the early 1500s.

===== Pawnee =====
The Pawnee ranged through the Great Plains and were first documented by Francisco Vázquez de Coronado when he met a Pawnee chief from Nebraska in 1541. Regarding Colorado, they hunted bison on plains of eastern Colorado.

===== Ute =====
Ute tribal ancestors migrated east from California in the 12th century. Before the 17th century, more of these indigenous people migrated from across both the Great Basin and Utah to occupy most of Colorado; more places occupied by the Ute tribe were northern New Mexico, Wyoming and Arizona . The Ute also stand as the oldest inhabitants of Colorado at the time of European contact, who chose a variety of locations for camps and routes; such as the Ute trail in the forest of the Grand Mesa. The language spoken by this tribe is a certain dialect of the Ute-Aztecan language, Shoshonean. it is generally believed that the migration of the Ute was in part an effort to separate themselves from other Shoshonean speaking tribes, such as Shoshone Bannock, Paiute, Comanche, Goshute, and Chemehuevi.

The Ute are the only Native American group with reservations in Colorado.
- Southern Ute Indian Reservation
- Ute Mountain Ute Tribe and Reservation

==== Occupation sequences ====
About AD 1700, the Ute and Apache shared the present state of Colorado, the Ute primarily and steadfastly in the Rocky Mountains and west and the Apache on the eastern plains. The Comanche entered the eastern half of Colorado early in the 1700s and with the Ute pressed the Apache to the southeastern portion of Colorado between about 1700–1750. By about 1820 the Comanche territory was the eastern part of the state. Between about 1820 and 1830 the Arapaho and Cheyenne, who had arrived from the northeast, pressed down the eastern side of Colorado pressuring the Comanche to the south, below the Arkansas River.

== See also ==
=== History ===
- History of Colorado
  - Indigenous peoples of the North American Southwest
  - List of prehistoric sites in Colorado
  - List of territorial claims and designations in Colorado
  - Outline of Colorado prehistory
  - Prehistoric migration and settlement of the Americas from Asia
  - Prehistoric Southwestern cultural divisions
  - Southwestern archaeology
  - Timeline of Colorado history

=== Colorado ===
- Bibliography of Colorado
- Early history of the Arkansas Valley in Colorado
- Geology of Colorado
- Index of Colorado-related articles
- Outline of Colorado
- Paleontology in Colorado
