= McKean site =

- McKean Archeological Site (48CK7)
- U.S. National Register of Historic Places
- Location within Wyoming Location within the United States
- Location: Within the Keyhole Reservoir
- Nearest city: Moorcroft, Wyoming
- Coordinates: 44°21′55″N 104°50′20″W
- Area: 45 acres (18 ha)
- NRHP reference No.: 91000326
- Added to NRHP: April 1, 1991

The McKean Site is an archaeological site in Crook County, Wyoming, United States. A premier site of the Great Plains hunting cultures, it is the namesake of the "McKean Complex." Two significant contemporary sites of the same culture are Signal Butte in Nebraska and the LoDaisKa Site in Colorado.

In 1991, the McKean Site was listed on the National Register of Historic Places.
