= Game drive system =

Hunting strategy

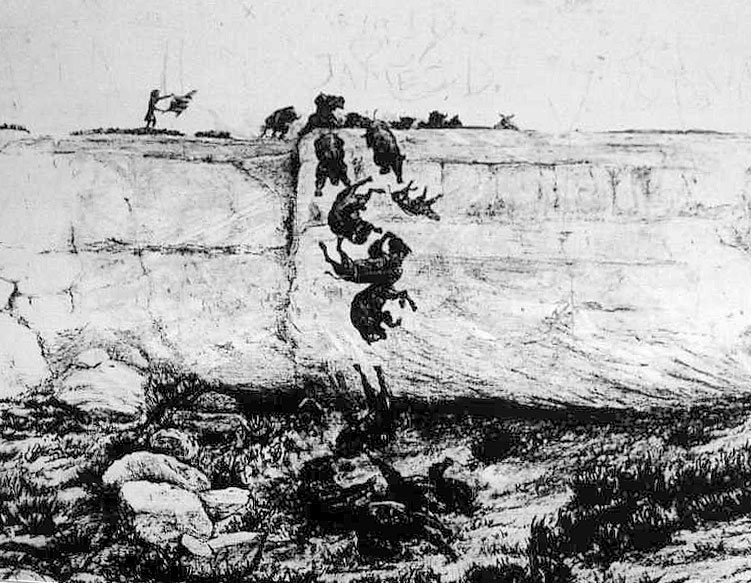
A "buffalo jump", where bison are driven over a cliff

The game drive system is a hunting strategy in which game are herded into confined or dangerous places where they can be more easily killed. It can also be used for animal capture as well as for hunting, such as for capturing mustangs. The use of the strategy dates back into prehistory. Once a site is identified or manipulated to be used as a game drive site, it may be repeatedly used over many years. Examples include buffalo jumps and desert kites.

== Game drives ==
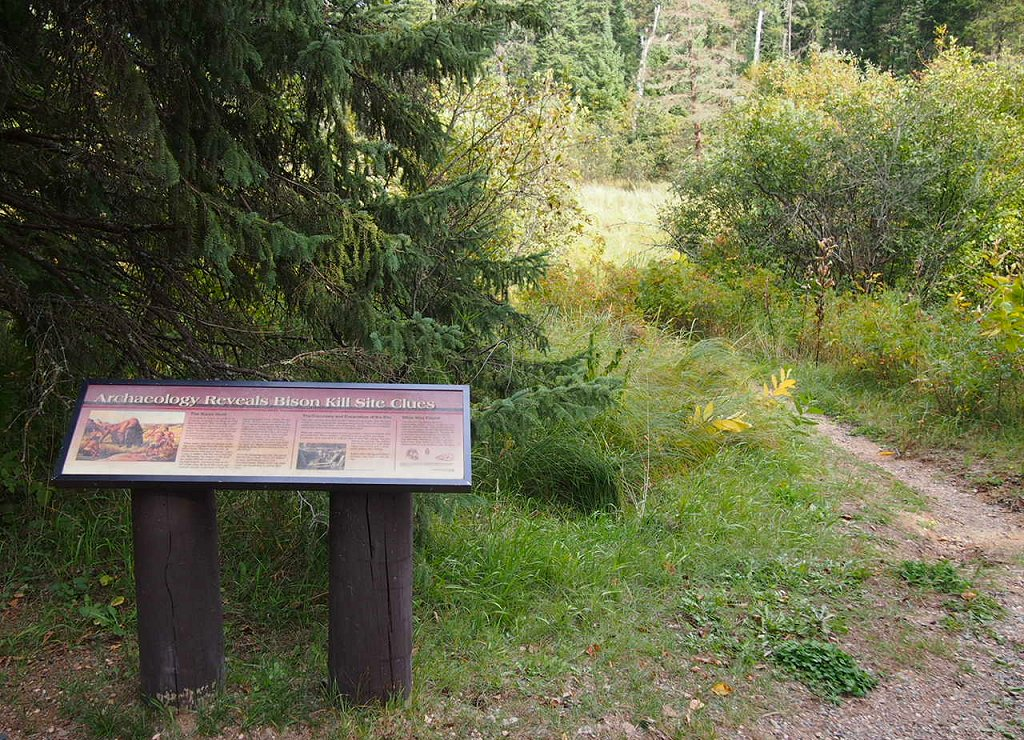
Itasca Bison Site, Itasca State Park, Minnesota

In the Rocky Mountain National Park, for instance, there are archeological remains from about 3,850 and 3,400 B.C. of 42 low-walled stone structures or cairns, up to hundreds of feet in length, built for game drive systems. These slight walls served as devices that permitted hunters to direct or herd game animals—like bison, sheep, deer, or elk—toward men waiting with weapons. Up to twenty-five people may have been needed to execute the game drive. Hunters may have killed the animals using darts, atlatl, spear throwers, or spears tipped with stone projectile points.

The Jones-Miller Bison Kill Site is an example of how the terrain was used about 8,000 B.C. as a game drive site. Remains of 300 bison were found in an arroyo, or draw, above the Arikaree River basin. It was believed that the bison were strategically driven into an area difficult for the bison to traverse and easier to kill on three occasions. Because many of the animals were nursing calves, it is estimated that the kills occurred in late fall or winter. Waldo Rudolph Wendel said in 1986 that it was the "most carefully studied bison kill" site.

== Buffalo jump ==
A buffalo jump is an example of a game drive system. Hunters herded the bison and drove them over the cliff, breaking their legs and rendering them immobile. Tribe members waiting below closed in with spears and bows to finish the kills. The Blackfoot Indians called the buffalo jumps "pishkun", which loosely translates as "deep blood kettle". This type of hunting was a communal event which occurred as early as 12,000 years ago and lasted until at least 1500 AD, around the time of the introduction of horses. The broader term game jumps includes buffalo jumps and cliffs used for similarly hunting other herding animals, such as reindeer. The Blackfeet believed that if any buffalo escaped these killings then the rest of the buffalos would learn to avoid humans, which would make hunting even harder.
