= Apex complex =

Historical cultural tradition

Apex complex is a cultural tradition of the Middle Archaic period. Apex complex artifacts, dated from about 3000 to 500 BC, first appeared in the Magic Mountain site near Apex Creek in Colorado.

The Irwins, archaeologists at Magic Mountain, believe that the artifacts are from ancestors of the Pueblo peoples of the American southwest. The cultural complex is distinguished by its Apex projectile points, which were noted for the increase in their frequency as one starts from the bottom to the top zone of the Magic Mountain site. Discovered tools also included scrapers, choppers, and leaf-shaped bifaces, which may have been used as knives.

Evidence of a few grave sites suggest that burials were conducted near their living areas, covered with stones and milling slabs. The functions and implications of the excavated artifacts, particularly the projectile points, are still not clearly understood. It is also noted that the characteristics of the projectiles reflect a parallel technological developments found in San Jose and northern New Mexico.

== See also ==
- List of prehistoric sites in Colorado
- Outline of Colorado prehistory
- Prehistory of Colorado

== Bibliography ==
- Gunnerson, James H. (1987). Archaeology of the High Plains. Denver: United States Forest Service.
