= Plano cultures =

Archaeological cultures of North America

Plano
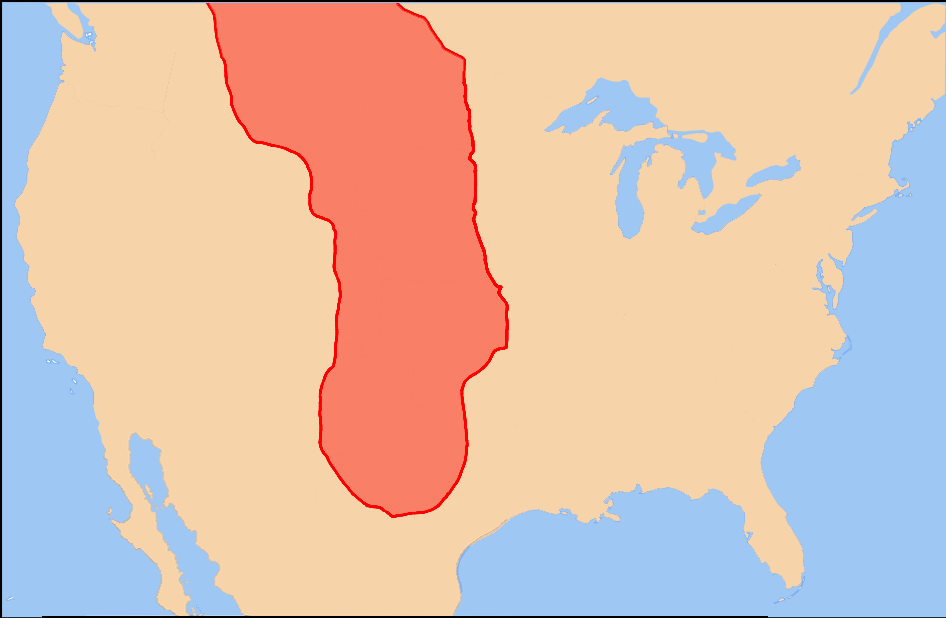
- Map of the Great Plains region
- Geographical range: Great Plains
- Period: Archaic
- Dates: 9000 – 6000 BCE
- Preceded by: Paleo-Indians
- Followed by: Old Copper Complex

The Plano cultures is a name given by archaeologists to a group of disparate hunter-gatherer communities that occupied the Great Plains area of North America during the Paleo-Indian or Archaic period.

== Distinguishing characteristics ==
The Plano cultures are characterised by a range of unfluted projectile point tools collectively called Plano points and like the Folsom people generally hunted Bison antiquus, but made even greater use of techniques to force stampedes off of a cliff or into a constructed corral. Their diets also included pronghorn, elk, deer, raccoon, and coyote. To better manage their food supply, they preserved meat in berries and animal fat and stored it in containers made of hides.

== History ==
The Plano cultures existed in the North American Arctic during the Paleo-Indian or Archaic period between 9000 BCE and 6000 BCE. The Plano cultures originated in the plains, but extended far beyond, from the Atlantic coast to modern-day British Columbia and as far north as the Northwest Territories. "Early Plano culture occurs south of the North Saskatchewan River in Saskatchewan and in the foothills of the Rocky Mountains north to the Peace River Valley of Alberta and adjacent British Columbia. At this time, most of Manitoba was still covered by Glacial Lake Agassiz and associated glacial ice."

Bison herds were attracted to the grasslands and parklands in the western region. Around 9,000 B.P. as retreating glaciers created newly released lake regions, the expansion of plant and animal communities expanded north and east, and the barren ground caribou in the tundra, boreal woodland caribou in the boreal forests and plains, and mountain caribou replaced bison as the major prey animal.

In the Great Plains, the following are Plano cultures from 10,000 to 7,000 years ago, distinguished by long, lanceolate projectile points:

- Agate Basin complex, named for the Agate Basin Site.
- Cody complex, named for the Horner site near Cody, Wyoming, includes the Olsen-Chubbuck Bison Kill Site and the Jurgens Site.
- Hell Gap complex, such as the Hell Gap, Wyoming site for which it was named and the Jones-Miller Bison Kill Site.
- Foothills / Mountain complex
