= LoDaisKa site =

Archaeological site in Colorado, United States

- LoDaisKa Site
- U.S. National Register of Historic Places
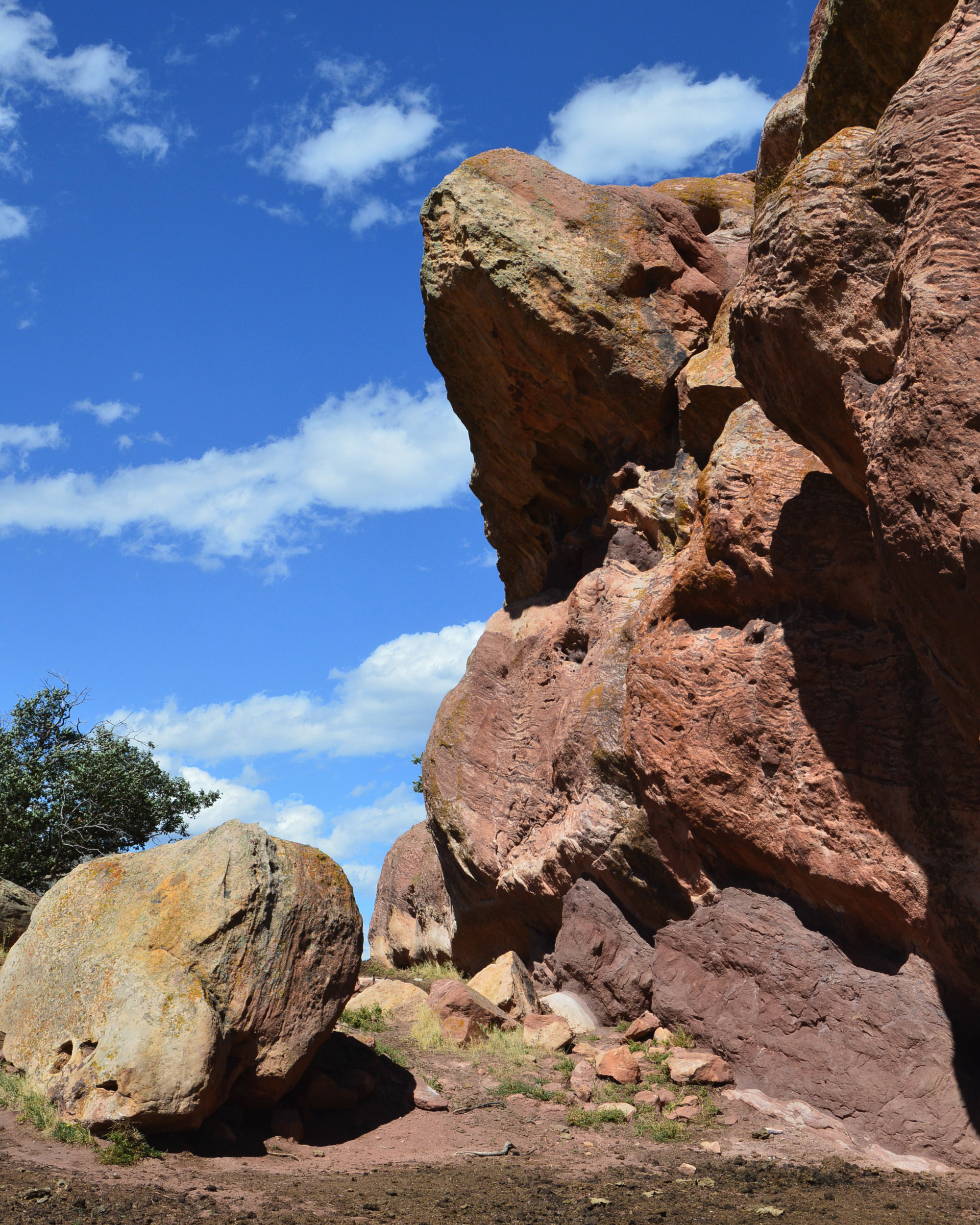

- Location within Colorado Location within the United States
- Location: Off U.S. Route 285
- Nearest city: Morrison, Colorado
- Coordinates: 39°37′39″N 105°11′38″W
- Area: 3.4 acres (1.4 ha)
- NRHP reference No.: 03000962
- Added to NRHP: September 25, 2003

The LoDaisKa Site is a prominent archaeological site in the U.S. state of Colorado, located within a rockshelter near Morrison. The rockshelter was first inhabited by people of the Archaic through the Middle Ceramic period, generally spanning 3000 BC to 1000 AD.

== Geography ==
Located near the town of Morrison, off U.S. Route 285, the site is located in the southern Rocky Mountains foothills, at about 6,200 feet (1,900 m) elevation, where uplifted Dakota Sandstone formed a steep hogback. The rockshelter is sheltered by distinctive 60 foot "red rock" formation, caused by an uplift of Fountain Formation rock. The Morrison area is between the locations of two important early people: Desert societies of the Great Basin west of the Rocky Mountains and those of the Great Plains, which lies to the east of the Rocky Mountain foothills.

== History ==
Within the Denver basin, prehistoric cultural periods are traditionally identified as: Paleo-Indian, Archaic and Ceramic periods. Within the LoDaisKa Site, five defined complexes were assigned from A to E by Cynthia C. Irwin (later Cynthia Irwin-Williams) and Henry Irwin, complex E being the oldest phase.

=== Paleo-Indians ===
The period immediately preceding the first humans coming into Colorado was the Ice Age Summer starting about 16,000 years ago. For the next five thousand years the landscape would change dramatically and most of the large animals would become extinct. Receding and melting glaciers created the Plum and Monument Creeks, the Castle Rock mesas and unburied the Rocky Mountains. Large mammals, such as the mastodon, mammoth, camels, giant sloths, cheetah, bison antiquus and horses roamed the land. There were a few Paleo-Indian cultures, distinctive by the size of the tools they used and the animals they hunted. People in the first, Clovis complex period, had large tools to hunt the megafauna animals of the early Paleo-Indian period. With time, the climate warmed again and lakes and savannas receded. The land became drier, food became less abundant, and as a result of the giant mammals became extinct. People adapted by hunting smaller mammals and gathering wild plants to supplement their diet. A new cultural complex was born, the Folsom tradition, with smaller projectile points to hunt smaller animals. Aside from hunting smaller mammals, people adapted by gathering wild plants to supplement their diet.

The earliest artifacts at the LoDaisKa rockshelter date from the Paleo-Indian period; the remains were from Complex E.

=== Archaic periods ===
People of the Archaic period (generally between 5500 and 1 BC) were hunters of small game, such as deer, antelope and rabbits, and gatherers of wild plants. The people moved seasonally to hunting and gathering sites. Late in the Archaic period, about AD 200–500, corn was introduced into the diet and pottery-making became an occupation for storing and caring food.

LoDaisKa Site is considered to be a Mount Albion complex, which was an Early Archaic culture of the Plains from about 4050 to 3050 BC, particularly distinguished by their Mount Albion corner-notched projectile. Magic Mountain, in the western foothills near Denver, and Mount Albion were both similar or related to the Albion Boarding House phase. A report published in 1966 found no correlation between the complexes.

=== Ceramic periods ===
The Early Ceramic, or Woodland, period began in the Plains about AD 1 with the defining distinction of the creation of cordwrapped pottery, development of settlement areas, and use of smaller projectile points for bow and arrow technology. Artifacts found reveal into the Middle Ceramic period. Few Colorado rockshelters have been shown to have been inhabited for such a long period of time.

=== Archaeology ===
The LoDaisKa Site artifacts include a hides, macrobotanical remains, wood artifacts, and a substantial collection of nonperishable artifacts from 3000 BC to AD 1000, which are classified into five site specific complex periods, from A through E.

==== Artifacts by complex period ====
LoDaisKa Archaeological Findings
Post-Pleistocene Period	Time Period	Culture traditions	Comments
Paleo-Indian		LoDaisKa complex E.	The earliest complex, contained a parallel flaked point and some chips, made from gravel below the rockshelter.
Beginning of the Middle Archaic Period	3000 to 1500 BC.	LoDaisKa complex D. Most closely related to the Great Basin Desert Culture, including Danger Cave in western Utah. Artifacts are also similar to the Uncompahgre of southwest Colorado and Ventana Cave in southern Arizona.	Triangular projectile points similar to the Desert Culture. A wide variety of tools similar to Danger Cave, such as knives, choppers, scrapers, discoidal, Uncompahgre, drills, hammerstones and more tools of stone, antler and bone. In addition there are paint stones, beads, gaming pieces, balls and pendants. A four-plane mano is among the artifacts, but is not an item found at Danger Cave. The complex did some farming, as evidenced by pollen and macro-fossils found during other items from this phase.
Middle Archaic period	1500 to 1000 BC.	LoDaisKa complex C. McKean complex of Wyoming and some Signal Butte complex in Nebraska	In general the points are shouldered, concave base, stemmed dart points, most of which could be Duncan points. There are 2 expanding stem points that may be Hanna points. The largest of the projectile points is similar to the Signal Butte I point, or a little less similar to the smallest McKean Lanceolate points. Other tools made of Prismatic flakes include cutting tools, end scrapers, scrapers made similarly, but larger than McKean tools. Milling slabs and rock-filled hearths were also found at this site.
Early and Middle Ceramic (Woodland)	700 to 1000 AD	LoDaisKa complex B. High Plains woodlands cultures, such as the Parker phase	A new form of maize emerges, a 16 row popcorn-like maize, similar maize has also been found at the Lawson site in Nebraska. Like the maize, pottery found from this complex is from the Woodland phase. Charcoal was found spanning the AD 700-1000 time period.
Possibly Middle and Late Archaic peoples	After 90 AD	LoDaisKa complex A. Fremont culture of western CO and eastern UT	Pottery and corncobs have also been found there. Surviving Dent maize, distinct from maize found in previous LoDaisKa complexes, closely resemble that found at the Bat Cave in New Mexico, which is known to be a Late Archaic (Desert Archaic) site; Both produced the "Chapalote" variety of the plant, which has been found in fossil form at LoDaisKa. The pottery is similar to Wormington's Turner Grey variety II.

Nelson also identified the general presence of seven lumps of red and yellow ochre stones, possibly the paint stones in Complex D. Stone cists used to store seeds were also mentioned, the time and culture is unknown.

In 1961, researchers reported the results of radiocarbon dating the site: they concluded that the earliest occupation of the site was around 3000 BC and that it was inhabited until at least AD 1000. As well, projectile points from LoDaisKa resemble and are contemporaneous with those found at such Great Plains sites such as the McKean site in Wyoming and Signal Butte in Nebraska; all these sites were inhabited during the time known in the eastern United States as the Woodland period.

==== Excavation and studies ====
LoDaisKa Excavations and Studies
Date	Name	Comments
1931–1932	Dr. E. B. Renaud	The first archaeological survey of sites in the Morrison area.
Date prior to 1958	LoDaisKa Bethel	First extensive survey of LoDaisKa site.
1958–1960	Henry J. and Cynthia C. Irwin	Excavation and studies.

=== Historical significance ===
Findings by the earliest archaeologists to investigate LoDaisKa were highly influential: regional archaeologists often interpreted their findings in accordance with what was known of LoDaisKa, and many other sites were excavated in part to answer questions that had resulted from research at LoDaisKa. In 2003, the LoDaisKa Site (designated site ID 5JF142) was listed on the National Register of Historic Places, qualifying because of the importance of the archaeological evidence found there.

== See also ==
- List of prehistoric sites in Colorado
- National Register of Historic Places listings in Jefferson County, Colorado

== Notes ==
a: An alternate dating, possibly by examination of the article or by a scientific form of dating, by Wendorf places the artifact in the early Archaic period.
