= Hell Gap complex =

Prehistoric Native American culture

The Hell Gap complex is a Plano culture from 10,060 to 9,600 before present. (Note: James Gunnerson reports dates from 7,500 BCE to 8,890 BCE, depending upon the site and archaeologist, which would be in roughly the same, but a longer, time period.) It is named after the Hell Gap archaeological site, in Goshen County, Wyoming.

== Other Hell Gap complex sites ==
In addition to the Hell Gap archaeological site, other Wyoming archaeological sites include the Sister's Hill site in northeastern Wyoming and a bison kill site near Casper, Wyoming. Jones-Miller Bison Kill Site is the only Hell Gap complex site in Colorado.

== Hell Gap point ==
The Hell Gap projectile points are long stemmed, convex blades.

== See also ==
- Goshen point — of the nearby Goshen complex.
