= Magic Mountain site =

Archaeological site in Colorado, United States

- Magic Mountain Site
- U.S. National Register of Historic Places
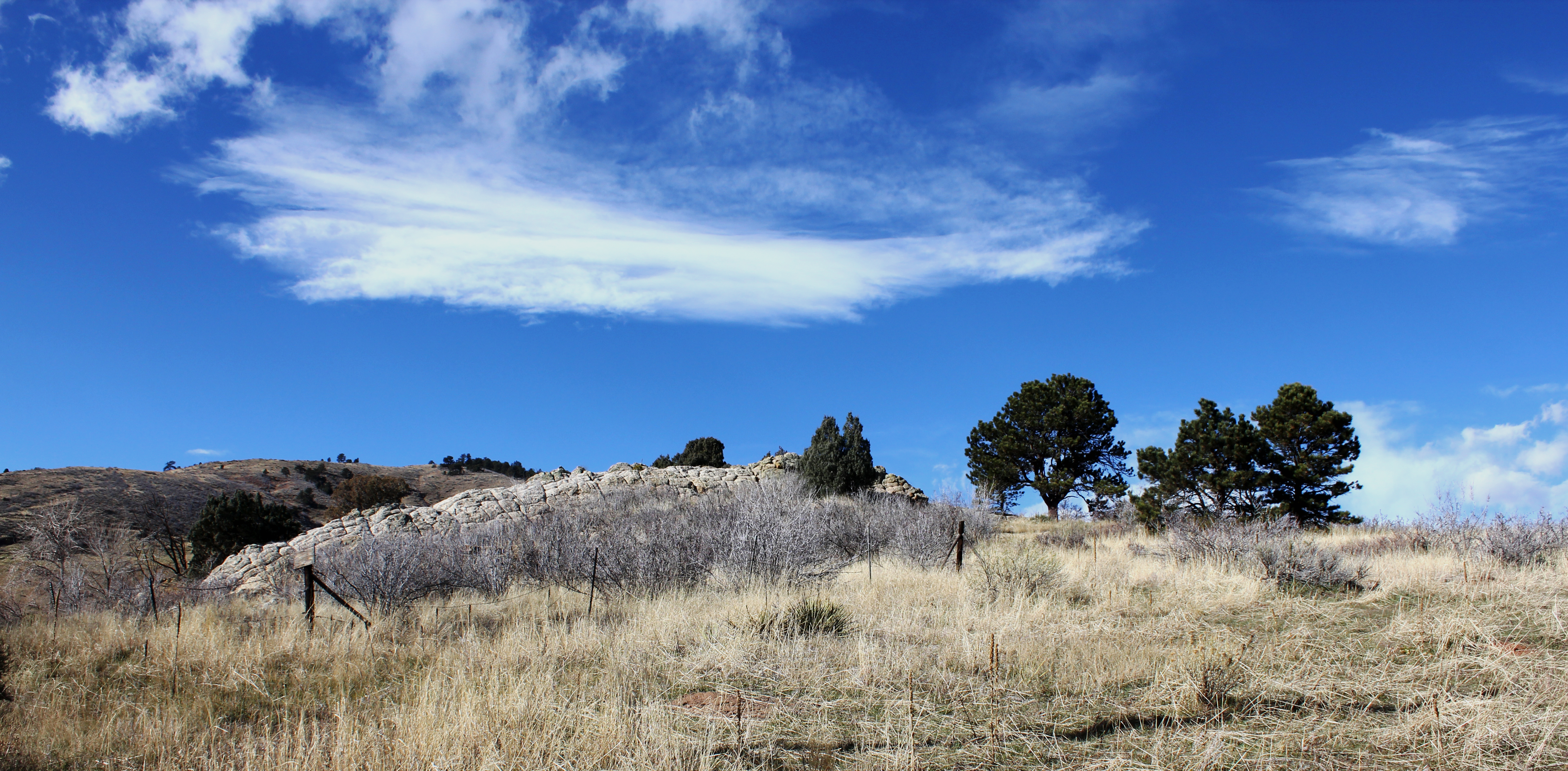
- Magic Mountain Site, Golden, Colorado
- Nearest city: Golden
- NRHP reference No.: 80000904
- Added to NRHP: 1980

The Magic Mountain Site is an Archaic and Woodland village site in Jefferson County, Colorado dating from 4999 BC to 1000 AD. The site was added to the National Register of Historic Places in 1980. (Note: The National Register of Historic Places site ID is 5JF223.)

The site was named for the property owner Magic Mountain Amusement Park in the late 1950s. One hundred years before, the area was the Apex mining district, served by a small stagecoach stop.

== Geography ==
Magic Mountain Site, in the foothills of the Rocky Mountains in the Denver Basin, is located by Apex Creek. The ecosystem is a transitional mountain-plains zone. It is located at: 39°42'50"N 105°12'42"W

== History ==
Within the Denver Basin, prehistoric time periods are traditionally identified as: Paleo-Indian, Archaic and Ceramic, or Woodland periods. The Denver basin is a geological definition of a portion of the Colorado Piedmont, from Colorado Springs, Colorado, to Wyoming. The Palmer Divide, with elevations from 6,000 to 7,500, is a subsection of that area that separates the South Platte River watershed from that of the Arkansas River. It runs perpendicular to the Rocky Mountains and divides the Denver metropolitan area from the southern Pikes Peak area.

=== Archaic periods ===
People of the Archaic period were hunters of smaller game, such as deer, antelope and rabbits, and gatherers of wild plants. The people moved seasonally to hunting and gathering sites. Late in the Archaic period, about 200-500 A.D., corn was introduced into the diet and pottery-making became an occupation for storing and carrying food.

=== Colorado High Plains Woodland period ===
The groups of people during this period became much more diverse, were more likely to settle in a location or a couple of locations, cultivate, domesticate animals, make pottery and baskets, and perform ceremonial rituals.

=== Archaeology ===
==== Artifacts ====
Lithic tools and projectile points were found at the site that helped to redefine past assumptions about the area Archaic and Woodland cultures. Corner notched projectile points found at the site were named Apex points and were similar to New Mexican En Medio and San José projectile points.

The archaeological evidence was obtained from six layers, classified into zones A-F.

Post-Pleistocene Period	Estimate Time Period	Cultural traditions
Early Archaic	4050-3050 BC	Zone F. Mount Albion complex.
Early Archaic	3050-2050 BC	Zone E. Magic Mountain complex. (Note: Magic Mountain complex is a variant or very similar to Mount Albion complex, an Early Archaic Plains culture from about 4050 to 3050 BC.)
Middle Archaic	1550 - 810 BC	Zone D. Apex complex.
Late Archaic	810 BC - AD 100	Zone C. Front Range phase.
Colorado Plains Woodland culture.	AD 100 - 1000	Zone B. South Platte phase.
Colorado Plains Woodland culture.	AD 100 - 1000	Zone A. South Platte phase.

There are some Fremont artifacts found in Zone A, judged to be attained through trading. A small cemetery led to the discovery of the archaeological remains on the site, but much of it had been looted before the excavation.

==== Excavations ====
Magic Mountain Excavations and Studies
Date	Name	Comments
1956	Regional studies.	
1959–1960	Cynthia Irwin-Williams, Peabody Museum of Harvard University	Three burials were found. Her findings were published in a book with her brother, Henry J. Irwin in 1966.
1994 & 1996	Centennial Archaeology LLC	
2017-2018	Paleocultural Research Group and Denver Museum of Nature and Science	

==== Collection ====
The collection of 2,500 artifacts from the Magic Mountain archaeological site were moved to the Denver Museum of Nature and Science in 2001.

=== Historical significance ===
The site is distinctive for its significant collection of Early, Middle and Late Archaic artifacts, burial sites and multi-cultural history.

== See also ==
- List of prehistoric sites in Colorado

== Bibliography ==
- Colwell, Chip; Nash, Stephen E.; Holen, Steven R. (2010) Crossroads of Culture: Anthropology Collections of the Denver Museum of Nature & Science. Boulder: University Press of Colorado.
- Gibbon, Guy E.; Ames, Kenneth M. Archaeology of Prehistoric Native America: An Encyclopedia. 1998. ISBN 0-8153-0725-X.
- Golden Pioneer Museum. (2002) Golden, Colorado. Chicago: Arcadia Publishing. p. 22. ISBN 0-7385-2074-8.
- Irwin, Henry J. and Cynthia C. Irwin (1966) Excavations at Magic Mountain: A Diachronic Study of Plains-Southwest Relations. Denver Museum of Natural History Proceedings Number 12. October 20, 1966.
- Justice, Noel D. (2002). Stone Age spear and arrow points of the Southwestern United States. Bloomington Indiana: Indiana University Press. ISBN 0-253-33912-X.
- Kipfer, Barbara Ann. (2000). Encyclopedic Dictionary of Archaeology. New York:Plenum Publisher. ISBN 0-306-46158-7.
- Nelson, Michael; Laubach, Tony. Where Is That? Explaining The Different Regions of Colorado. The Denver Channel. October 27, 2009. Retrieved 9-28-2011.
- Nelson, Sarah M. (2008). Denver: An Archaeological History. Boulder, CO: University Press of Colorado. ISBN 978-0-87081-935-3.
- Waldman, Carl (2009) [1985]. Atlas of the North American. New York: Facts on File. ISBN 978-0-8160-6858-6.
