= Signal Butte =

- U.S. National Register of Historic Places
- U.S. National Historic Landmark
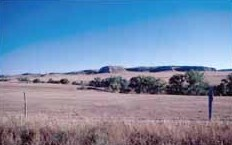
- Signal Butte

- Location within Nebraska Location within the United States
- Nearest city: Gering, Nebraska
- Coordinates: 41°47′50″N 103°54′24″W
- NRHP reference No.: 66000452

Significant dates
- Added to NRHP: October 15, 1966
- Designated NHL: January 20, 1961

Signal Butte is a major prehistoric archaeological site in rural western Nebraska, United States. Designated by the Smithsonian trinomial 25SF1, it was one of the first pre-contact Native American sites to be formally investigated in the central plains. The archaeological sites are located atop the eponymous butte west of Robidoux Pass and Gering, Nebraska. It was declared a National Historic Landmark in 1961. The site is not open to the public.

== Description ==
The eponymous Signal Butte rises about 120 feet (37 m) above the plains in the watershed of the North Platte River in westernmost Nebraska. The butte is covered by a layer of gravel and windblown soil, in which there are three distinct layers of cultural material. The oldest layers have been dated to 5,000 years ago, in the Middle Archaic Period. Finds at the site include stone projectile points and drills, and bone tools such as awls.

The butte first came to the notice of professional archaeologists in 1931, when a local amateur notified William Duncan Strong of materials found there. Strong led investigations of the butte in 1931 and 1932, during which numerous artifacts were found, as well as features such as storage pits, fireplace hearths, and other signs of repeated habitation. The site is one of the first from which a radiocarbon date was obtained, although the exact dates of habitation have been the subject of some controversy and ongoing debate. The site was investigated further in the 1940s and 1950s, at which time it was established that the sites probably represented seasonal hunting camps.

== See also ==
- List of National Historic Landmarks in Nebraska
