= Draw (terrain) =

Long area of downward-sloping low ground

Example on a topographical map, and how it would look in the real world.

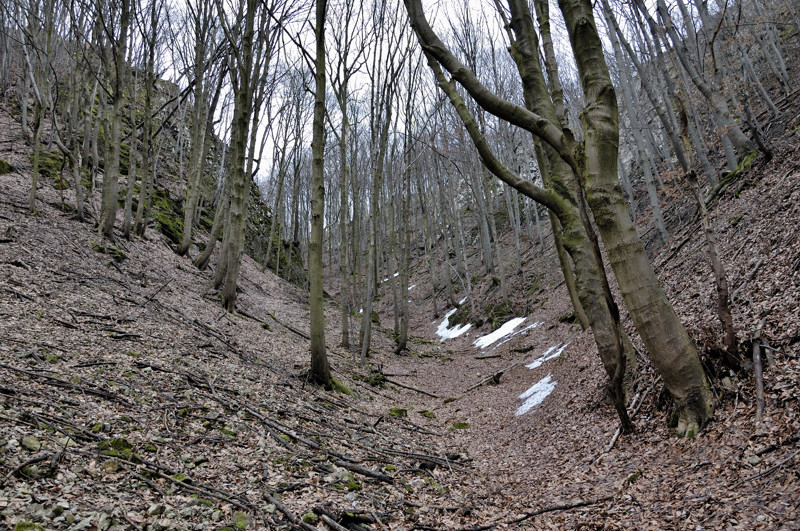
Typical draw, Little Carpathians

A draw, sometimes known as a re-entrant in orienteering, is a terrain feature formed by two parallel ridges or spurs with low ground in between them. The long area of downward sloping low ground itself is the draw, and it is defined by the spurs surrounding it.

== Characteristics ==
Draws are usually etched in a hillside by water flow, are usually dry, but many contain an ephemeral stream or loose rocks from eroded rockfall. In a draw the ground always slopes downward in only one direction, and upward in the other three. The slope on a draw is generally quite sharp, with a clearly established fall line and characterized by a generally steep vertical drop over a short horizontal distance. There is essentially no level ground and little or no maneuver room within the draw. On a topographical map, the contour lines depicting a draw are U-shaped or V-shaped, pointing toward high ground.

A draw can be conceptually thought of as the inverse of a spur, much how a valley can be considered the inverse of a ridgeline. In land navigation training, students are typically taught to visualize these features by making a closed fist with their hand; the knuckles form "hills" individually (and a ridgeline collectively), and from there the fingers represent spurs while the gaps in between fingers represent draws.

=== Comparison with valleys ===
Draws are less developed stream courses than valleys, and are similar to valleys on a smaller scale; however, while valleys are by nature parallel to a ridgeline, a draw is perpendicular to the ridge, and rises with the surrounding ground, disappearing up-slope. In some cases, a draw could be considered as the initial formation of a valley.

== Etymology ==
The term "draw" has almost completely supplanted usage of "re-entrant" in common parlance; apart from a few geologists, only orienteers regularly use latter term.

== See also ==
- Arroyo (watercourse) – Dry watercourse with flow after rain
- Canyon / Gorge – Deep chasm between cliffs
- Chine – Steep-sided coastal gorge in central southern England
- Couloir – Steep, narrow mountain gully
- Defile (geography) – Narrow pass or gorge between mountains or hills
- Gully – Landform created by running water and/or mass movement eroding sharply into soil
- Mountain pass – Route through a mountain range or over a ridge
- Riparian zone – Interface between land and a river or stream
- Salient (military) – Battlefield front breakthrough progressing into enemy territory
- Transverse valley – Low-lying area deeply interrupting a mountain chain
- Wadi – Hydrological feature
