= Goshen point =

The Goshen point is a medium-sized, lanceolate-shaped, Paleo-Indian projectile point with a straight or concave base. It exhibits characteristic fine flaking.

The point was named in 1988 by George C. Frison after the discovery of specimens at the Hell Gap complex site in southeastern Wyoming. The projectile is so-named after the nearby Goshen County.

== Mill Iron Site ==
The Mill Iron Site, located in Carter County, Montana and discovered in 1979, is a site belonging to the Goshen Complex. The site was excavated from 1984 to 1988. The excavation was also led by George C. Frison. 31 complete and broken Goshen points were found. 11 of these points were found in the campsite area, 12 were in the meat processing bed, and 7 were on the surface. This meat processing bed is thought to be a meat processing site rather than a kill site because it was a stack (4.5 meters in diameter) of single bison bones and other organized carcass parts. A large goshen point found in this meat processing bed is thought to have been used for ritual offerings rather than a weapon to kill animals. This is because of the carefully rounded tip, when typically a sharp point is made instead. Many other lithic blades were discovered in the Mill Iron Site in addition to the goshen points.

== Goshen complex ==
Goshen complex, distinguished by the Goshen point, is similar to the Plainview complex. The Goshen complex, dated about 9,000 to 8,800 BCE, occurred between the Clovis culture and Folsom culture periods. The Goshen Complex was first recognized at the Hell Gap Site in the 1960s.
