= Chetro Ketl =

Ancestral Puebloan archeological site in New Mexico, US

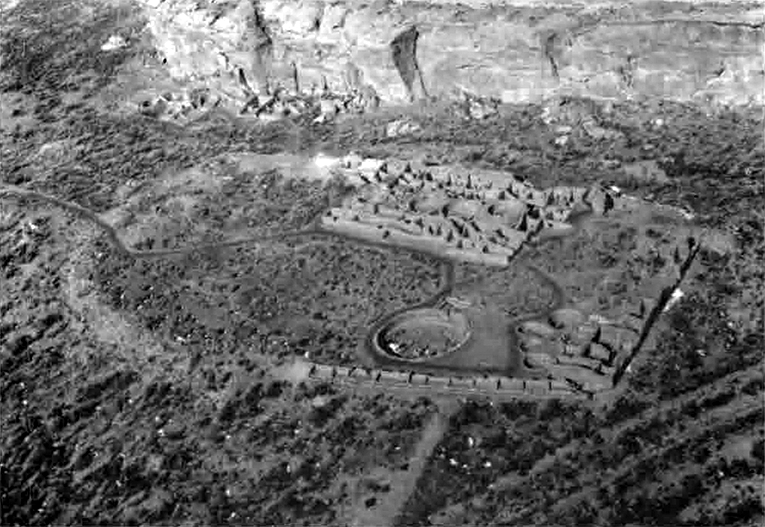
- Aerial view from the south

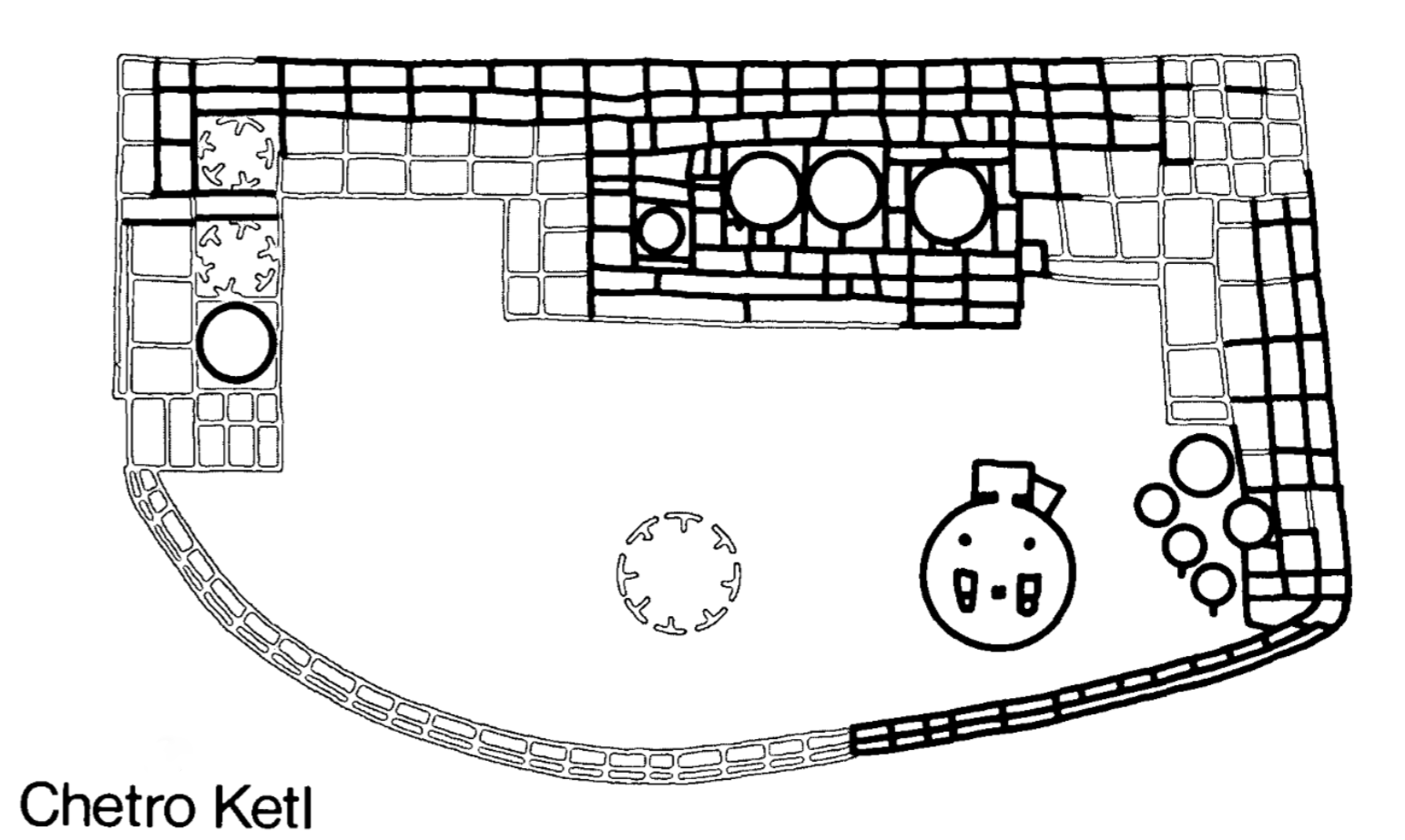
- Site map (darker lines denote excavated areas)
- 36.06°N 107.95°W
- Location: Chaco Culture National Historical Park, New Mexico, United States
- Nearest city: Gallup, New Mexico

History
- Built: 945–1070

Site notes
- Elevation: 6,000 feet (1,800 m)
- Area: 3 acres (1.2 ha)
- Architectural style: Ancestral Puebloan
- Governing body: National Park Service

Chetro Ketl is an Ancestral Puebloan great house and archeological site located in Chaco Culture National Historical Park, New Mexico, United States. Construction on Chetro Ketl began c. 990 and was largely complete by 1075, with significant remodeling occurring in the early and mid-1110s. Following the onset of a severe drought, most Chacoans emigrated from the canyon by 1140; by 1250 Chetro Ketl's last inhabitants had vacated the structure.

The great house was rediscovered in 1823 by the Mexican governor of New Mexico, José Antonio Vizcarra, and in 1849 Lieutenant James Simpson of the United States Army Corps of Engineers documented the major ruins in Chaco Canyon. Edgar L. Hewett, the director of the first archeological field school in the canyon, conducted excavations of Chetro Ketl during 1920 and 1921, and again between 1929 and 1935.

Chaco scholars estimate that it required more than 500,000 man-hours, 26,000 trees, and 50 million sandstone blocks to erect Chetro Ketl. The great house is a D-shaped structure; its east wall is 280 feet (85 m) long, and the north wall is more than 450 feet (140 m); the perimeter is 1,540 feet (470 m), and the diameter of the great kiva is 62.5 feet (19.1 m). Chetro Ketl contained approximately 400 rooms and was the largest great house by area in Chaco Canyon, covering nearly 3 acres (1.2 ha). Chetro Ketl lies 0.4 miles (0.64 km) from Pueblo Bonito, in an area that archeologists call downtown Chaco; they theorize that the area may be an ancestral sacred zone. Chetro Ketl contains architectural elements, such as a colonnade and tower kiva, that appear to reflect a Mesoamerican influence.

Chetro Ketl's purpose is widely debated but many archeologists believe the building was a place of large-scale ceremony that held an important position within the larger Chacoan system. It may have been occupied primarily by groups of priests and, during times of ritual, pilgrims from outlying communities. Archeologist Stephen H. Lekson believes Chetro Ketl was a palace inhabited by Chacoan royalty, and the scale of its construction was motivated by what architects call "massing": building imposing structures with the intent to impress onlookers. The building has deteriorated significantly since its rediscovery in the early 19th century, and its usefulness as a source of information about Chacoan culture is slowly diminishing.

== Background ==
Long ago in the north, below from the Place of Emergence, everybody came out. Now when those who are everyone's chiefs came out they all went out. They went down south ... They went along coming from the north, and they began to make towns.

— Cochiti origin myth

During the 10th to 8th millennia BCE, the San Juan Basin was occupied by Paleo-Indians known as the Clovis culture (c. 9,300) and the Folsom tradition (8,500 to 7,500). Projectile points found in the vicinity of Chaco Canyon suggest that hunters may have been active in the region as early as 10,000. By 6,000 the Picosa culture had developed from within the Paleolithic population, as environmental changes caused the eastward movement of animals and people to the Southern Plains, bringing Southwestern and northern Mexican cultures into the San Juan Basin. Cynthia Irwin-Williams proposed that the first human presence in Chaco Canyon dates to a hunter-gatherer society that she named the Oshara tradition, which developed within the local Archaic (c. 6,000 to 800) Picosa population. The Oshara occupied portions of northwestern New Mexico, northeastern Arizona, southeastern Utah, and central and southwestern Colorado. They harvested jackrabbits in the basin as early as 5500. Irwin-Williams divided the Oshara Tradition into six phases, and during the Armijo phase (1800 to 800) the Arroyo Cuervo area east of Chaco Canyon saw the introduction of maize and the use of rock shelters. She hypothesized that this period saw the beginning of seasonal gatherings of people from around the San Juan Basin, who eventually began to aggregate into larger social units.

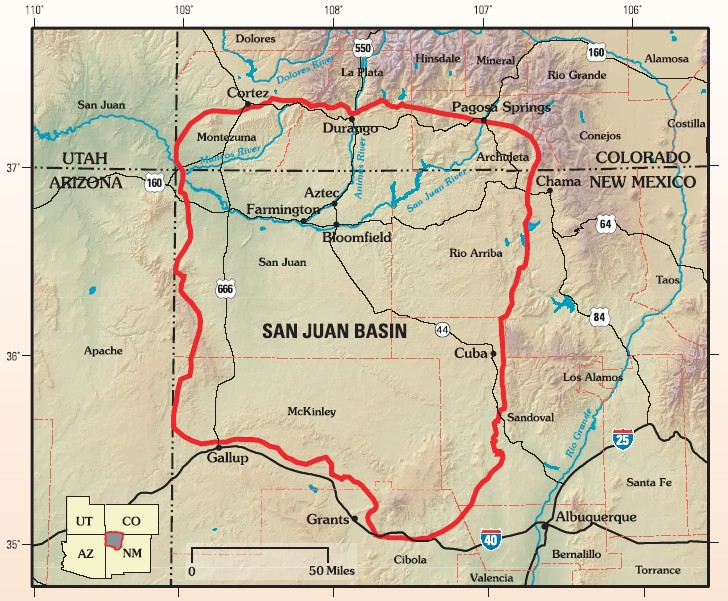
The San Juan Basin, USGS map, 2002

Area occupied by the Ancestral Puebloans

By 200 BCE, the Basketmaker culture had begun to develop from the Oshara Tradition. At least two groups of transitional Basketmaker II people inhabited the San Juan Basin during this period, as increased rainfall allowed for sustained agriculture and permanent settlements by 1 CE, when the water table rose and intermittent streams became more reliable. During the first four centuries CE, the Basketmaker II people established pit-houses at elevated locations near sources of water and arable land. Brian M. Fagan notes that the development of pottery in the area during the 4th century permitted the boiling of maize and beans for the first time, and "must have brought a revolution in cooking". This period also marked the introduction of the bow and arrow to the region.

Parts of the San Juan Basin saw plentiful rainfall during the 5th to 8th centuries, leading to significant expansion of pit-house communities. Population increases during the 6th century led to the settlement of the area's lowlands, including Chaco Canyon, as the Basketmaker II people changed from a primarily hunter-gatherer society to one based on farming. This culture is known as Basketmaker III, and by 500 at least two such settlements had been established in Chaco Canyon. An important phase of Basketmaker III people is known as the La Plata. One of the earliest La Plata phase sites, Shabik'eshchee Village, was continuously occupied until the early 8th century, when the canyon was home to a few hundred people. Several clusters of Basketmaker III sites have been identified in the vicinity of Chetro Ketl.

As the Basketmaker III people improved their farming techniques during the 8th century, the well-watered areas of the San Juan Basin became densely populated. Greater crop yields necessitated the construction of above-ground storage facilities, which were the first large-scale construction projects in the region. Fagan identifies this as the beginning of the first pueblos, "ushering in a period of profound social tension, population movements, and political change." In his opinion, "by 800, there was no going back. The people of Chaco and elsewhere were locked completely into economies based on maize and bean cultivation." Archeologists refer to the period starting c. 800 as the Pueblo I Period. By the early 10th century the large pit-house settlements had been supplanted by modular construction that later served as the foundation for the Ancestral Puebloan great houses. (Note: Windes believes that the first Ancestral Puebloan great houses were built not in Chaco Canyon, but in southwestern Colorado, near the Dolores River. Powers, Gillespie, and Lekson note, "it is impossible to determine if construction of the Chaco Canyon structures was earlier than the outlying Chacoan structures, or vice-versa.") This marks the beginning of the Bonito Phase. During the 10th century, Chaco's population was swelled by a steady influx of immigrants from the San Juan River, approximately 100 miles (160 km) north. Fagan notes, "Within a few centuries, as rainfall became more irregular and life less predictable, the Chacoans embarked on a cultural trajectory that melded ancient traditions with new ideas that were to crystalize into a brilliant and short-lived Southwestern society."

== Location and alignment ==
External image
- Chaco Research Archive
- Interactive map of downtown Chaco

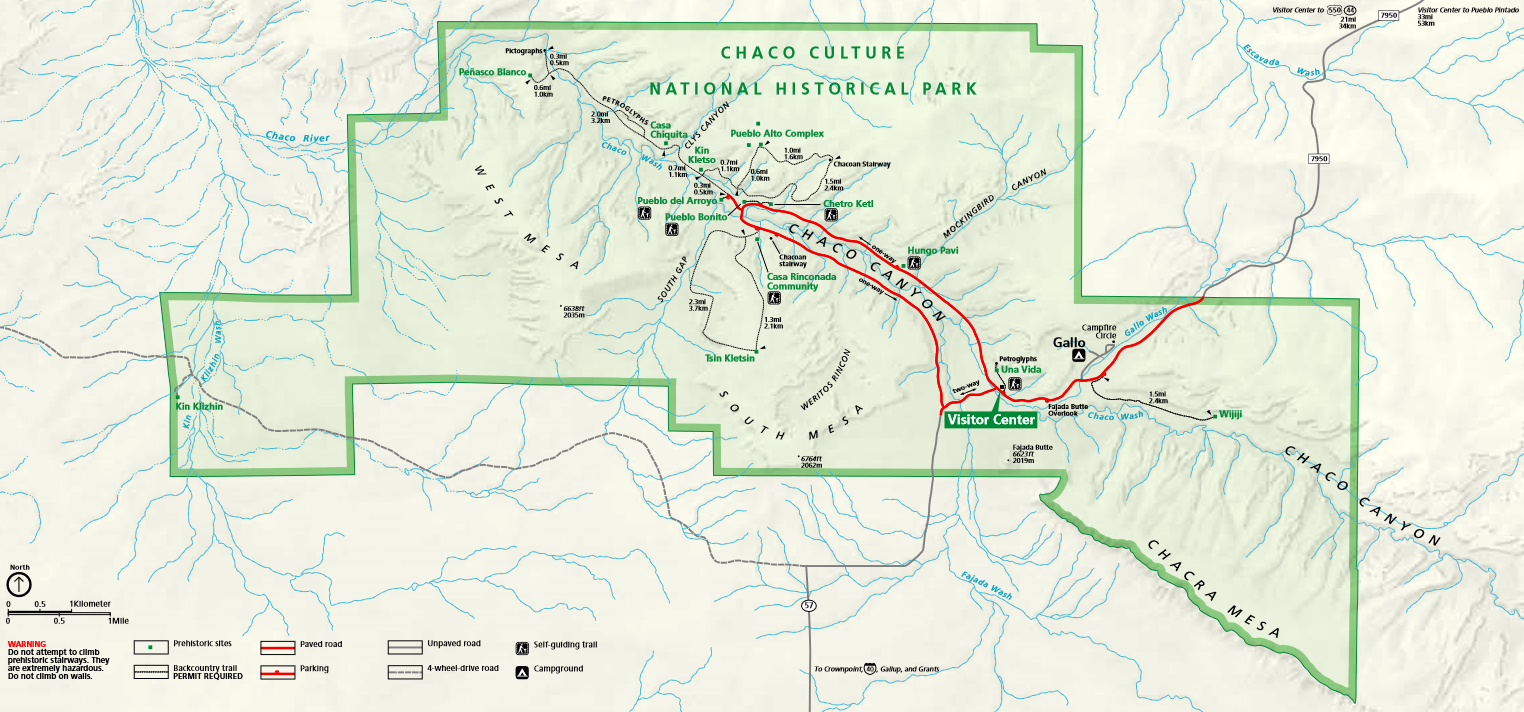
Chaco Culture National Historical Park

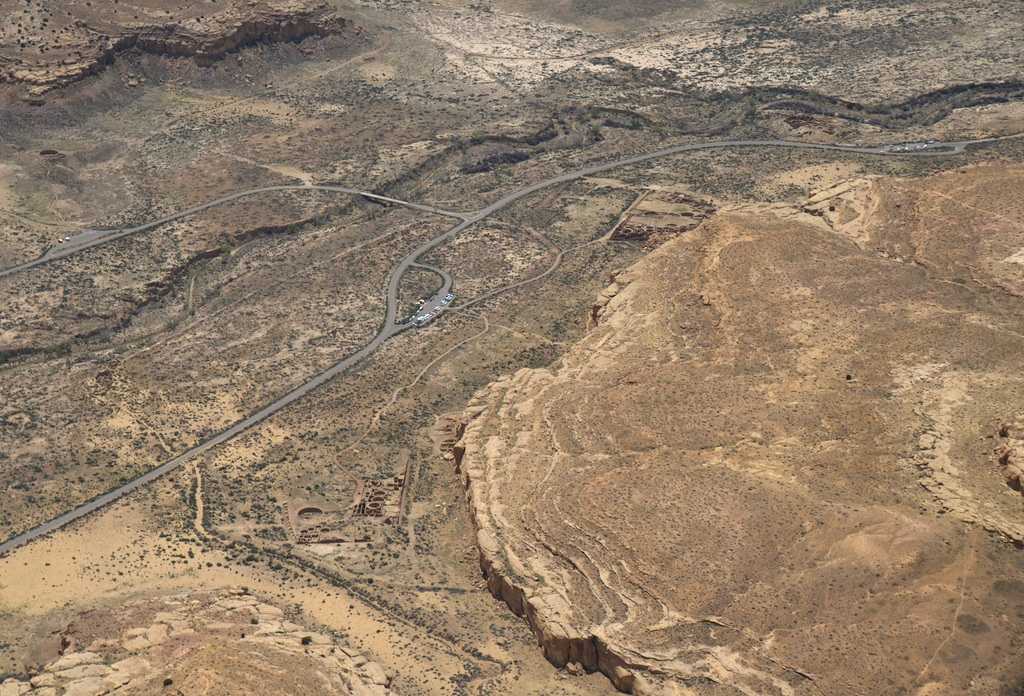
Aerial overview of downtown Chaco from the east, with Chetro Ketl (lower left), Pueblo Bonito (center), and Pueblo del Arroyo (upper right)

Chaco Canyon lies at the geographic center of the San Juan Basin. It is located in northwestern New Mexico 60 miles (97 km) north of Interstate 40 and 130 miles (210 km) from Gallup, the nearest city. The continental divide is 20 miles (32 km) east. Chaco Canyon was created by the Chaco River, which cut several hundred feet into Chacra Mesa. The elevation of the sandstone canyon and the surrounding high-desert terrain is approximately 6,000 feet (1,800 m). Though most of the Chacoan sites are located at the bottom of the canyon, the group also includes some ruins not in the canyon proper, extending 35 miles (56 km) from Kin Ya'a in the south to Pueblo Alto in the north, and 20 miles (32 km) from Pueblo Pintado to the northeast and Peñasco Blanco in the southwest. In terms of water drainage and cultural affinity, the area is part of the San Juan Basin, which includes Mesa Verde in Colorado and Kayenta, Arizona.

Chetro Ketl lies 0.4 miles (0.64 km) east of Pueblo Bonito, in an area that archeologists call downtown Chaco. Scholars theorize that the area may be an ancestral sacred zone demarcated by a low masonry wall that encloses Chetro Ketl, Pueblo Bonito, and Pueblo del Arroyo. Chetro Ketl's position is symmetrical to Pueblo Bonito; the buildings are equidistant from a north–south axis that runs across the canyon. Anna Sofaer proposed that many of the great houses in Chaco Canyon were constructed to emphasize astronomical alignments; during the minor lunar standstill, the full moon rises along Chetro Ketl's back wall. (Note: Archaeoastronomy suggests Chetro Ketl's great kiva was aligned with Ursa Major.)

Chetro Ketl is located opposite a large opening in the canyon known as South Gap, which helped maximize the building's exposure to the sun while increasing visibility and access to the south. Its rear wall runs parallel to the canyon, and at less than 100 feet (30 m) from the cliffs its proximity allowed inhabitants to benefit from passive solar energy emanating from the rocks. Chetro Ketl is not perfectly aligned to the cardinal directions, but its nominal southerly orientation further enhanced solar exposure to its tiered rooms.

== Construction ==
Like other great houses in Chaco Canyon, Chetro Ketl was built over an extended period, during which the Ancestral Puebloans quarried large amounts of sandstone from the surrounding canyon. W. James Judge describes the period from 1030 to 1130 as "Chaco's golden century, a period virtually unmatched elsewhere in the pre-Columbian Southwest". By 1085, the Chacoans had constructed great houses at Chetro Ketl, Pueblo Alto, and Pueblo del Arroyo, during what Fagan describes as "a time of extraordinary growth and outreach".

=== Timber ===
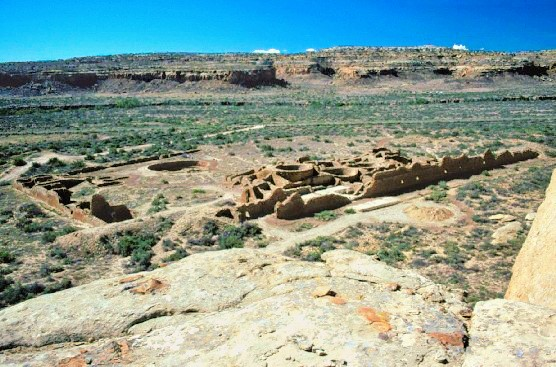
Chetro Ketl from the north overlook

In 1983, dendrochronology of wood samples from Chetro Ketl provided information on species selected, season of cutting, wood modification and use, as well as an estimate of the number of trees required to build the great house. Trees were harvested for construction at Chetro Ketl annually, which contrasts with the sporadic patterns found at other sites in the canyon. Whereas a late summer and early fall harvesting time has been documented at other Chacoan sites, the tree felling for Chetro Ketl was undertaken primarily during the spring and early summer. This may indicate that enough in-house labor was available during the farming season, or that specialized groups of Chacoans were dedicated to tree felling irrespective of the agriculture cycle, when most others were busy with field preparation and planting. One particularly well sampled room suggests that wood was cut during the relatively short span of a couple of weeks per season.

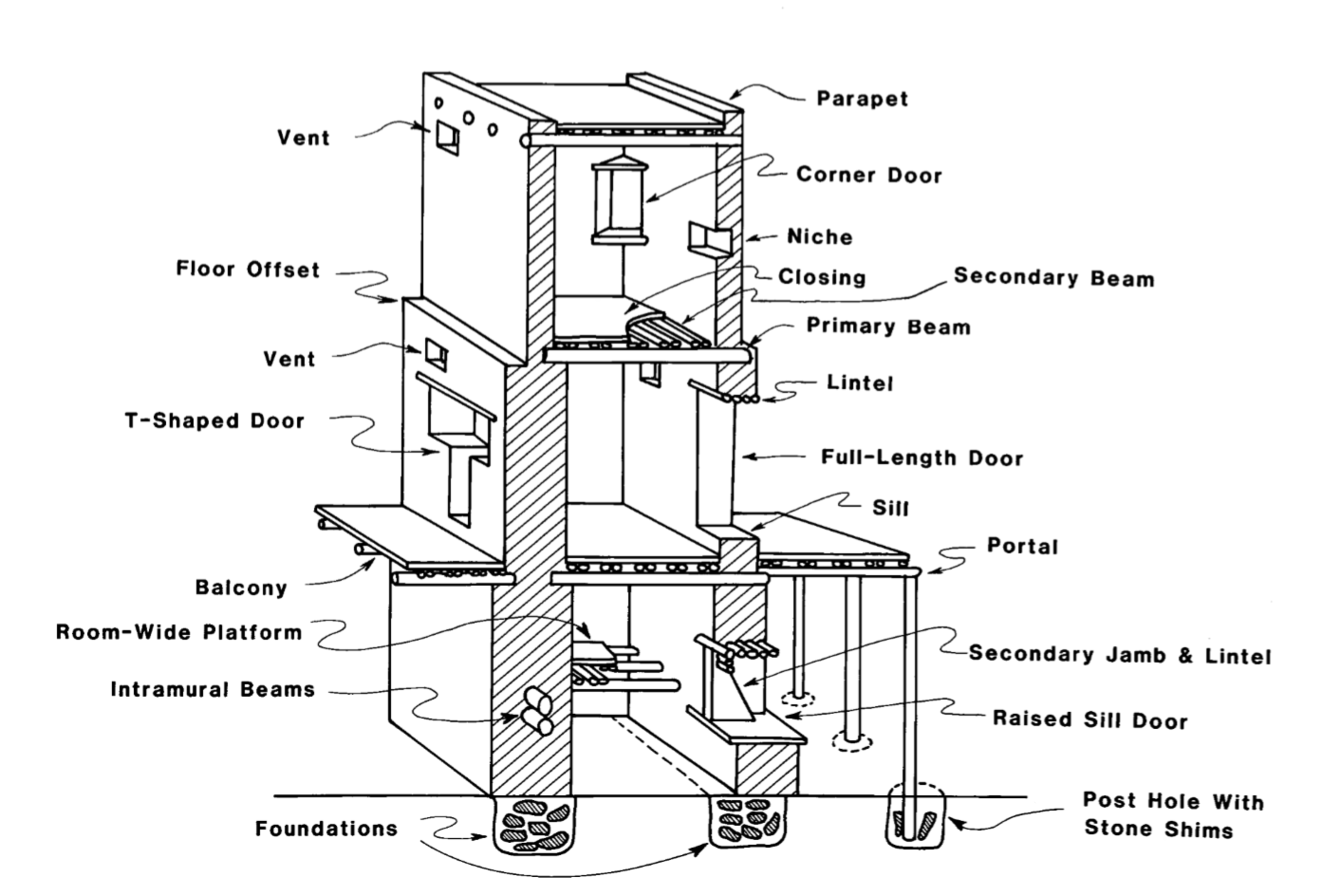
Chacoan construction features

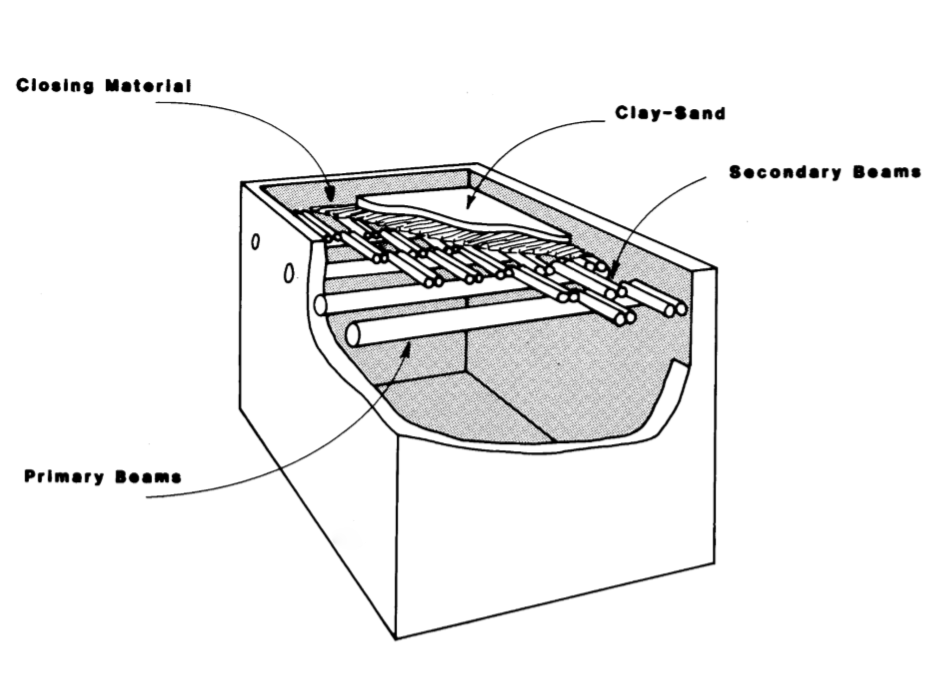
Chacoan flat roof

The most commonly harvested tree species was ponderosa pine; the Chacoans felled approximately 16,000 of them for use at Chetro Ketl, and the species is now absent from the canyon. Archeologists Florence M. Hawley and Neil Judd proposed that a plentiful forest may have existed in and around the canyon during the 10th and 11th centuries, but was eventually destroyed by over-harvesting. Dean and Warren believe this is unlikely, but the presence of trees in the canyon during the 20th century "suggests that some pines may have been locally available for use in the large towns". In their opinion, "the harvesting of trees for Chacoan construction must have decimated ponderosa pine stands and forests for many miles in every direction from Chaco Canyon." Archeologists believe the trees were processed where they were cut, then carried, not dragged, back to Chaco Canyon.

A 2001 analysis of strontium isotopes indicates that after 974 the Chacoans harvested architectural timbers primarily from two locations: the Chuska Mountains and Mount Taylor, in the San Mateo Mountains, both located approximately 47 miles (76 km) distant. Despite their equal proximity, they did not harvest from the Nacimiento Mountains. The selection of timbers from the Chuska and San Mateo ranges, and the avoidance of those from the Nacimiento Mountains, suggests that "regional socioeconomic ties" factored more heavily into timber procurement than "resource depletion with distance and time".

Nearly 78 percent of the estimated 26,000 trees harvested for use at Chetro Ketl were felled between 1030 and 1060. More than 7,000 trees were felled for kiva (round room) construction alone, with approximately 750 used in the great kiva. Roofs typically consisted of primary beams, secondary beams, and one or two layers of split shakes, probably of a juniper species or pinyon pine, which were locally available. Most of the primary and secondary construction beams were of ponderosa pine. In addition to bulk materials, construction required other items in smaller quantities. Cordage was used for lashing roof elements together, and baskets and wood frames were needed for transporting mortar and rock. Other tools, such as digging sticks and hammerstones, were used in quantity; many discarded hammerstones have been found built into the wall interiors.

=== Stone and mortar ===
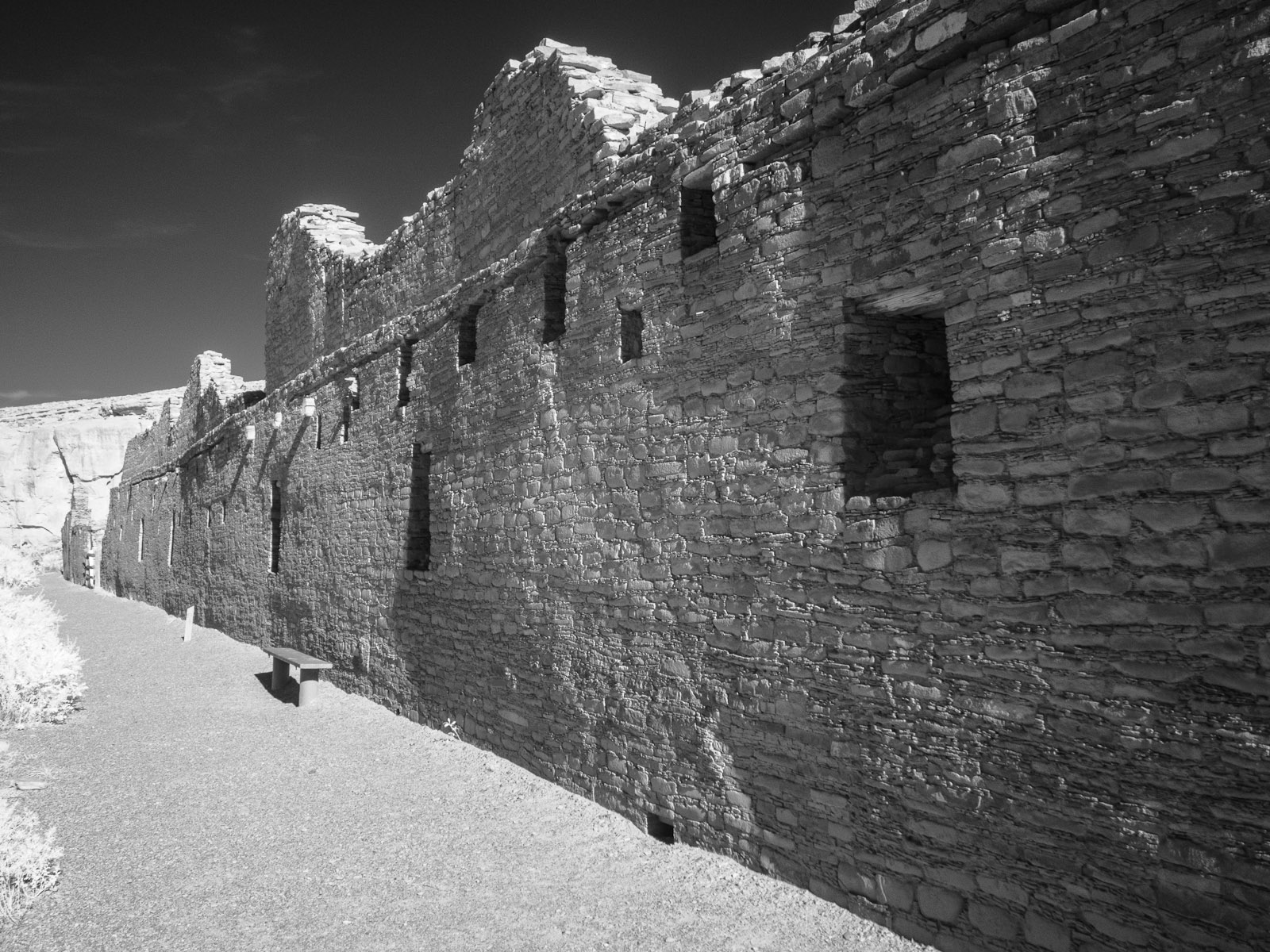
Chetro Ketl's north wall

Chetro Ketl's walls were constructed using three bulk materials: stone, clay-sand, and water. Two types of stone were used: a hard gray-brown tabular sandstone that forms the bench above Chaco Canyon's cliffs, and a softer, tan, massively bedded sandstone that forms the cliffs themselves. Chacoans preferred the harder, tabular stone as it was easier to shape, but much of it had to be dug up and levered out of the ground with wooden poles. Because the massive tan stone of the cliff faces was easier to procure, but much more difficult to work, the Chacoans probably used it only after the more easily quarried gray-brown stone beds had been depleted.

The Chacoans used clay or clay-sand and water to make mud mortar. They obtained most of the material from canyon deposits, but some of the clays may have been collected from the base of the cliffs. Clay and clay-sand in soils or stream deposits were accessed by digging large pits, then mixing mortar in the pits and carrying the mix to the construction site in baskets. Water is scarce in Chaco Canyon and construction probably took place primarily during the late summer and early fall rainy season, when it was more readily available. Water was also collected from small reservoirs in the slick rock and deep wells in the bed of Chaco Wash.

=== Masonry ===
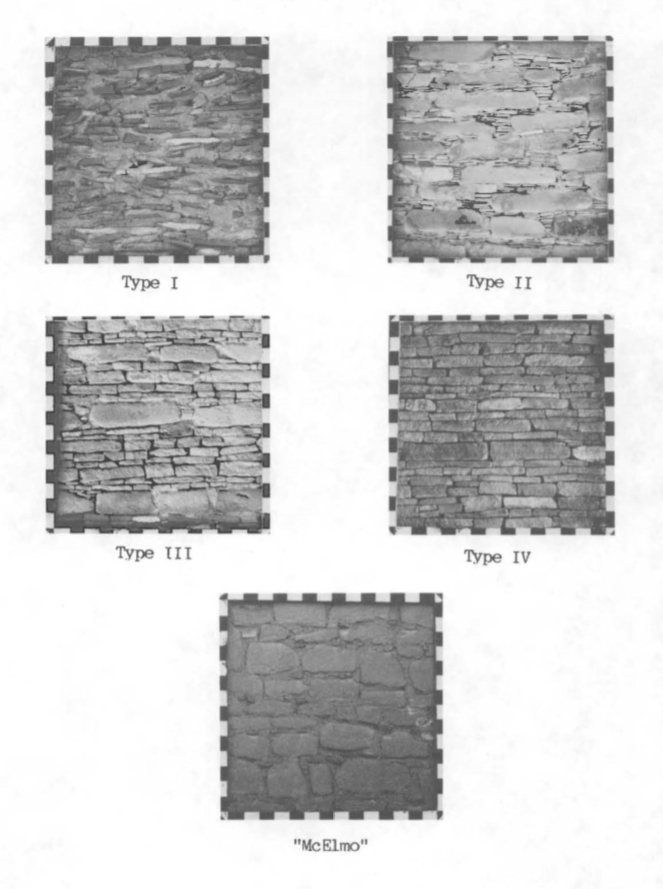
Chacoan masonry styles

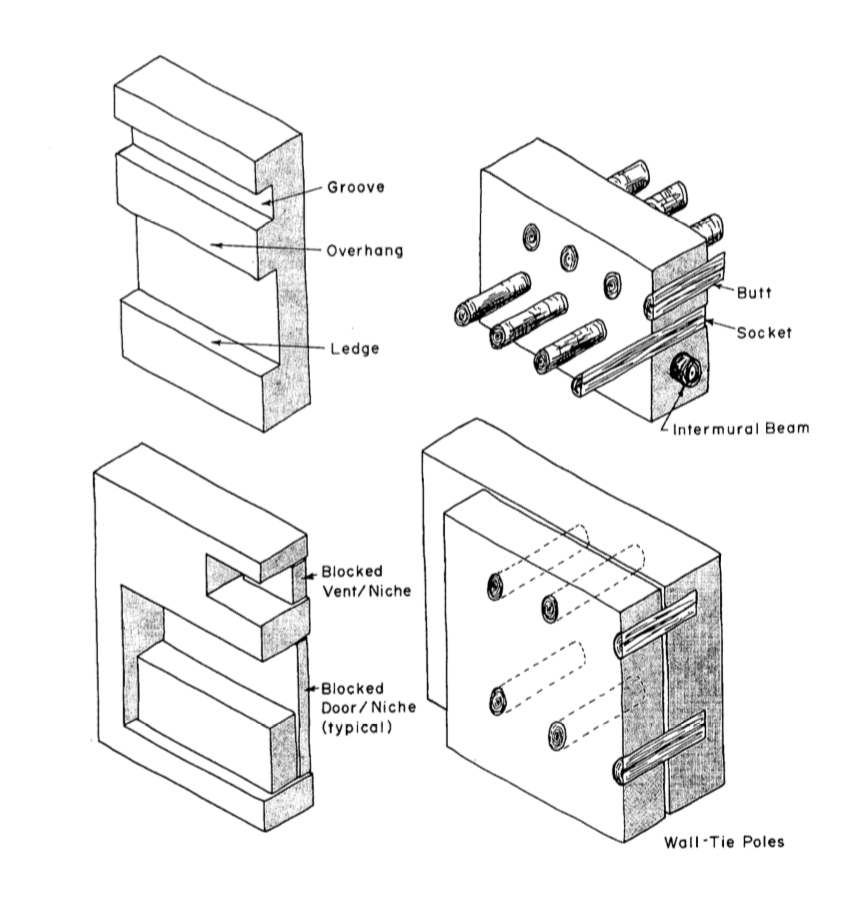
Chacoan wall features

Only the most highly skilled Chacoans shaped and set stone; others carried supplies and mixed mortar. The width of a given wall was determined by its place in a structure. The first story of a two-story wall is always wider than the second. Chacoan walls are often called core-and-veneer, but only the widest walls had cores. The Chacoans tried to build walls with two flush faces, but because the stones were typically quite small, to build a wider wall they built up a space between the two faces; this spacing is often called the core. In most walls, the core consisted of roughly shaped stone or rubble laid at the same time as the two faces. In others, the faces were built up independently, and the core packed between them. Chacoan walls derive their stability from the degree of contact between stones in the faces and the width of the wall itself, not from the strength of the core.

Chacoan wall faces are typically called "veneers", but they were integral load-bearing elements rather than decorative overlays. The veneers are known for their attention to coursing and detail, and various styles have become synonymous with Chacoan building. Depending on the facing style, the joints between the stones would be filled with spalls or chinks, set in mud mortar; or the coursing could alternate between larger stones and several courses of smaller tablets. Good veneer minimized the amount of exposed mortar, which reduced maintenance, maximized stone contact, and increased the strength of the wall. It also reduced the possibility of structural failure. Aside from structural considerations, some veneers are the result of highly skilled masons working within well-developed craft traditions. Recurring veneer patterns may indicate a widespread style used during a particular period, or they may suggest the work of a specific social group or line of builders.

Doors and vents often had sills of carefully ground flat stone slabs and lintels constructed from a row of thin wood beams. Chacoan masons also frequently included intramural beams – horizontal logs completely enclosed in the wall core – which were probably intended to reduce horizontal deformation of the wall. The interior walls of great houses were typically covered in a rock veneer. Judd identified four distinct types, and his typology is the most commonly accepted in the region. Chetro Ketl's interior walls, particularly those in the eastern wing, were covered in a Type IV veneer characterized by uniform pieces of sandstone with little to no exposed mortar. Judd excluded a fifth type of masonry, called McElmo style, from his typology.

=== Phases ===
Building phases at Chetro Ketl by Florence M. Hawley

Second phase (1030–1070; masonry types II and III)

Second phase (1062–1090; masonry type III)

Third phase (1100–1116; masonry types III, IV, and V)

In 1934, Florence Hawley used 143 tree-ring dates and a comparative masonry analysis to assemble a construction history of Chetro Ketl in three major periods: 945–1030, from which no significant elements are observable; 1030–1090, when construction and remodeling produced most of the building's extant features; and 1100–1116, which saw renovation of existing features. In 1983, comprehensive architectural studies by Lekson and McKenna and dendrochronological reanalysis by Dean and Warren largely verified Hawley's construction phases, with significant additions and clarifications. Lekson, Thomas C. Windes, and Patricia Fournier, authors of "The Changing Faces of Chetro Ketl", date the beginning of construction to 990–1000; they based their estimate on 1,285 dated elements from the great house. (Note: More tree-ring dates from Chetro Ketl have been collected than for any other Chacoan great house; sixty per cent of all such dates taken at the canyon pertain to the structure.) In their opinion, Chetro Ketl was largely complete by 1075, with periodic construction occurring there until the mid-1110s, when the great kiva was remodeled.

Hawley's first period (945–1030) was suggested by tree ring dates scattered throughout later parts of Chetro Ketl. Archeologists subsequently discovered that her second period (1030–1090) structure was built directly over an earlier (990–1030) one-story-tall, two-room-wide row of rooms. Lekson shortened Hawley's second period to 1030–1075, and subdivided it into at least eight different construction events, including the successive additions of upper stories along the main room block, running the length of the building. After 1075, construction consisted of minor additions and alternations, with the exception of a row of three large, Chaco-style second- and third-story round rooms that were added to the plaza-facing center of the main room block during 1075–1095. Much of the later construction, including the large Chaco-style kivas, was in McElmo style masonry, using shaped blocks of relatively soft tan colored sandstone instead of the previously preferred harder, denser dark brown sandstone, which may have been quarried out in the central canyon after 1075. Chetro Ketl required an estimated 50 million sandstone blocks and more than 500,000 man-hours to complete.

==== McElmo ====
The McElmo Phase was a period in the late 11th and early 12th centuries, when major changes in ceramics and masonry techniques appeared in Chaco Canyon. Chacoans started using painted black-on-white pottery, and the masonry and layout of great houses built during the period, which was the last major construction era in the canyon, differs significantly from those built during the Bonito Phase (850 to 1140). Archeologists initially believed that the McElmo style was brought to Chaco Canyon by immigrants from Mesa Verde, but subsequent research suggests the developments were of local origin. McElmo black-on-white pottery was abundant in later contexts at Chetro Ketl, and the problematic McElmo style masonry was used in several later additions to the building, including very characteristic Chaco-style kivas.

Chetro Ketl's Kiva G complex was constructed using McElmo-type masonry, and ceramic evidence uncovered from refuse found in the great house indicates a significant McElmo presence. Much of the masonry in North Block F also appears to be McElmo style. A smaller square building known as the Talus Unit lies just west of Chetro Ketl; it contains some McElmo style features. R. Gwinn Vivian (son of Gordon Vivian) notes, "The jury is still out on this question, a problem that poses intriguing possibilities for future work."

== Abandonment ==
They didn't abandon this place. It is still occupied. We can still pray to the spirits living in these places from as far away as our pueblo. The spirits are everywhere. Not just the spirits of our ancestors, but tree spirits and rock spirits. If you believe that everything has a spirit, you will think twice before harming anything.

— Puebloan oral tradition

The Ancestral Puebloans relied on regular rainfall to sustain their agricultural society. This proved challenging in Chaco Canyon, even with consistent precipitation. By 1130, the rains had diminished and the maize crops that the Chacoans depended on had begun to fail, as the region increasingly suffered from the effects of a devastating, fifty-year drought. After a continuous occupation of more than six hundred years, the Chacoans began to migrate from the canyon. Fagan states that by 1140 "Chaco was finished". A study of 12th-century burials in the Gallup, New Mexico, area indicates as many as half of the people who lived during the drought died before the age of eighteen, with sixty percent of all deaths occurring before age thirty-five. The study estimated that for every woman, four children were needed to sustain the agriculture workforce.

The turning point for Chacoan culture prior to the widespread crop failures of 1130 to 1180 was the especially dry period from 1090 to 1095. Emigration from Chaco Canyon increased significantly during this period, and Puebloan construction in outlying communities such as Mesa Verde, Salmon, and Aztec, began to flourish. Despite rapid depopulation in the canyon, Chetro Ketl's great kiva may have been remodeled and used during the early 13th century. A haphazardly applied layer of rubble veneer to ceremonial areas in the great kiva is thought to have been added during an "organized closure" that probably included a "termination ceremony". Ancient potsherds indicate that the last inhabitants of Chetro Ketl vacated the structure by 1250.

== Rediscovery ==
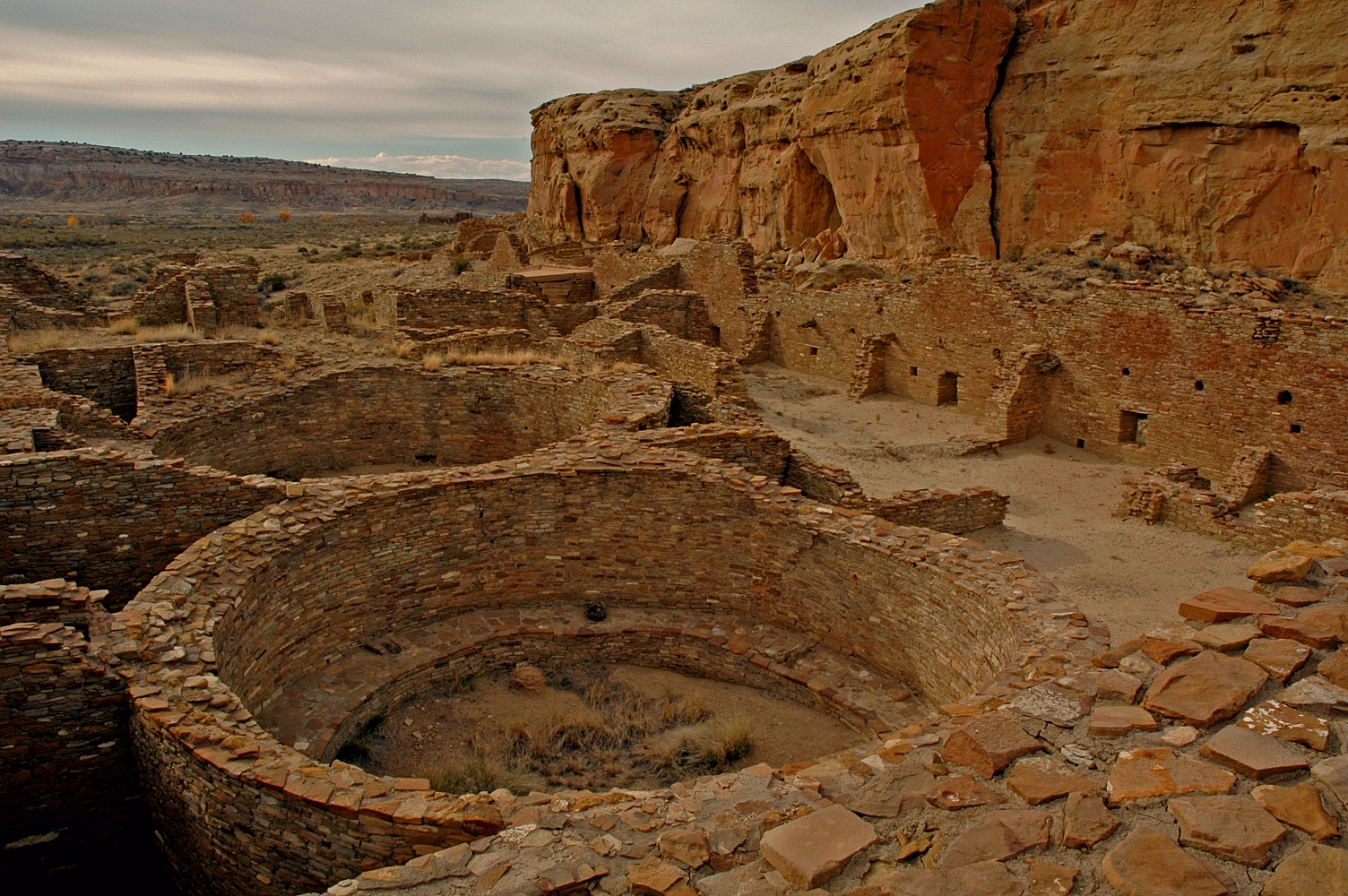
Chetro Ketl, facing west, with the north wall at top right

In the years following the Ancestral Puebloan's departure from Chaco Canyon, several migrations to the region occurred. During the 15th century, Navajo people emigrated to the area from northwestern Canada, and in the 18th century Spanish explorers and settlers came from the south. The Spanish investigated parts of the San Juan Basin, but there is no record of them ever finding Chaco Canyon. When cartographer Bernardo de Miera y Pacheco drew a map in 1774 of Spanish land holdings in the region, he labeled Chaco Canyon with the word Chaca, but it is unlikely he ever visited the area. In 1823 the governor of New Mexico, José Antonio Vizcarra, discovered ancient ruins in the canyon during a military campaign against the Navajo. Vizcarra's account is the first historical record of the Chacoan great houses that were "of such antiquity that their inhabitants were not known to Europeans". (Note: The Spanish first came to the region around 1540, but there is no evidence that they explored the San Juan Basin before the late 1700s.) In 1844, Josiah Gregg made the first published reference to Chaco Canyon in his popular book, Commerce of the Prairies.

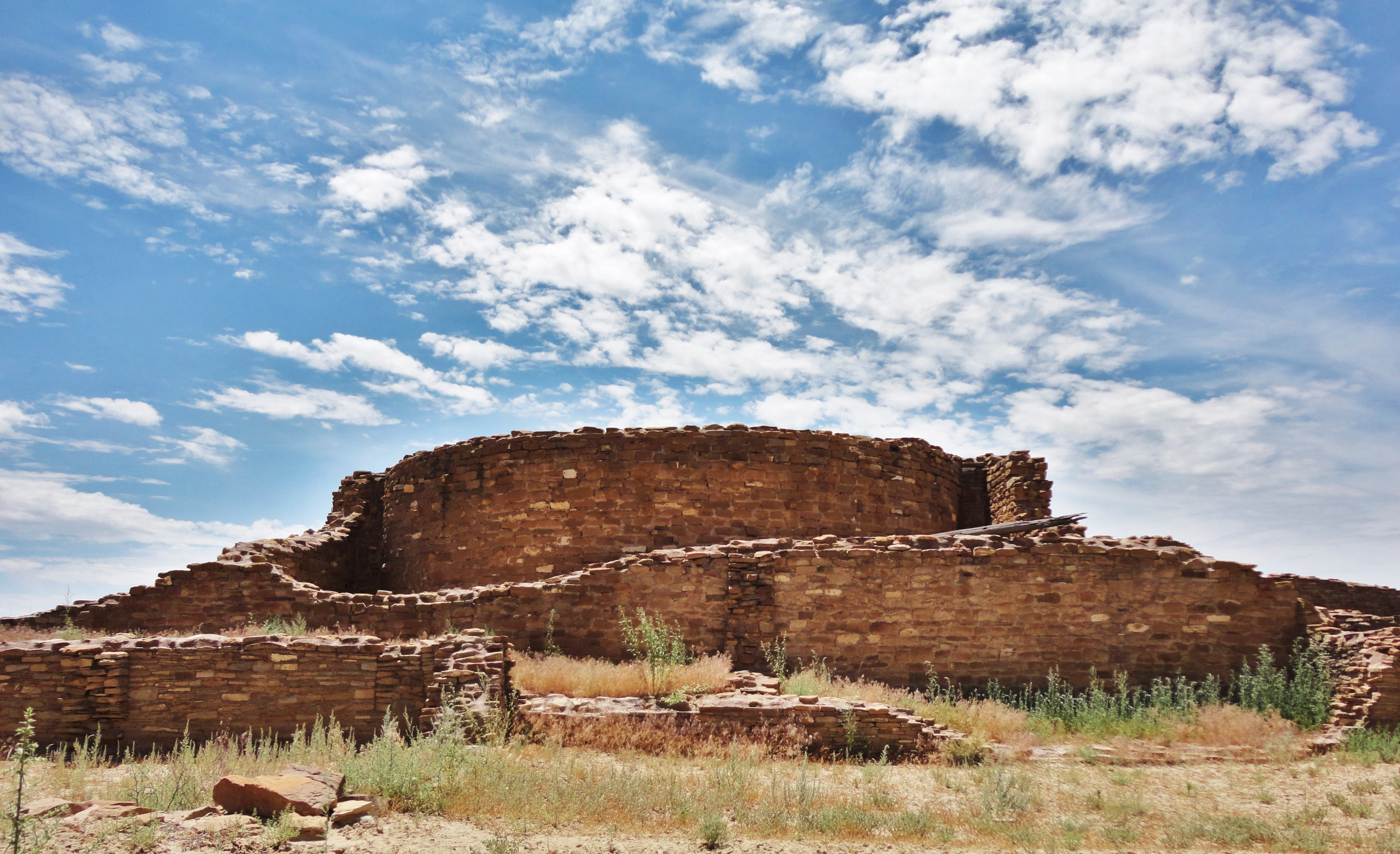
The tower kiva at Chetro Ketl, from the north

The United States started exploring the region following the Mexican–American War of 1846–1848 and the acquisition of the New Mexico Territory. During a military campaign against the Navajo in 1849, Lieutenant James Simpson of the United States Army Corps of Engineers became interested in the canyon's ruins. A group led by the governor of Jemez Pueblo, Francisco Hosta, explored the canyon; its members included Simpson and the brothers Richard and Edward Kern, who were respectively an artist and a cartographer. Simpson was impressed by Chetro Ketl's masonry, which he described as "a combination of science and art which can only be referred to a higher stage of civilization and refinement than is discoverable in the works of Mexicans or Pueblos of the present day." Simpson and company documented their findings, noting the location and style of the great houses, taking measurements, and sketching the canyon's major ruins. They described the kivas as "circular apartments sunk in the ground". Simpson briefly explored Chetro Ketl, documenting six of its round rooms and 124 rooms on the ground floor of the four-story building. He noted an especially well preserved room where "the stone walls still have their plaster upon them in a tolerable state of preservation." Vivian credits Simpson's 1850 report detailing their brief exploration of the canyon and Richard H. Kern's lithographs as the beginning of Chacoan archeology. (Note: In 1877, William Henry Jackson photographed the great houses in Chaco Canyon with the intent to produce model-sized recreations of the structures. He climbed out of the canyon using an ancient stairway, which was later named Jackson Staircase in his honor. Jackson later discovered that the film he used to take photographs of the canyon was defective, and none of the images developed.) The scientific investigation of Chaco Canyon started when Richard Wetherill began his exploration of the canyon in 1895. Wetherill was well known for his discovery of some of the largest Ancestral Puebloan dwellings in Mesa Verde, and after an invitation from amateur archeologist Sidney Palmer to survey Chaco Canyon, organized a one-month expedition to the region. He secured financial backing for a full season soon afterward, and in 1896 full-scale excavations began at Pueblo Bonito. (Note: The Hyde Exploring Expedition, sponsored by brothers Talbot and Fred Hyde Jr., and directed by Dr. George H. Pepper, conducted excavations in Chaco Canyon until 1901, when accusations of impropriety levied by Hewett put an end to their archeological surveys. A subsequent investigation by Steven Holsinger of the US General Land Office vindicated the Hydes and Wetherill. Wetherill later filed a homestead claim that granted him temporary ownership of Chetro Ketl.)

=== Etymology ===
The true origin and meaning of "Chetro Ketl" is unknown. Lekson and Peter J. McKenna note that, although most of the names given to Chacoan ruins are either Spanish or Navajo, "Chetro Ketl is neither." A Mexican guide who worked for the first American expedition in 1849 translated it as "rain town". In 1889, Navajo historian Washington Mathews reported that in Navajo mythology the building is referred to as Kintyél or Kintyéli, which means "broad-house". Other Navajo translations include "house in the corner" and "shining house".

== Excavation ==
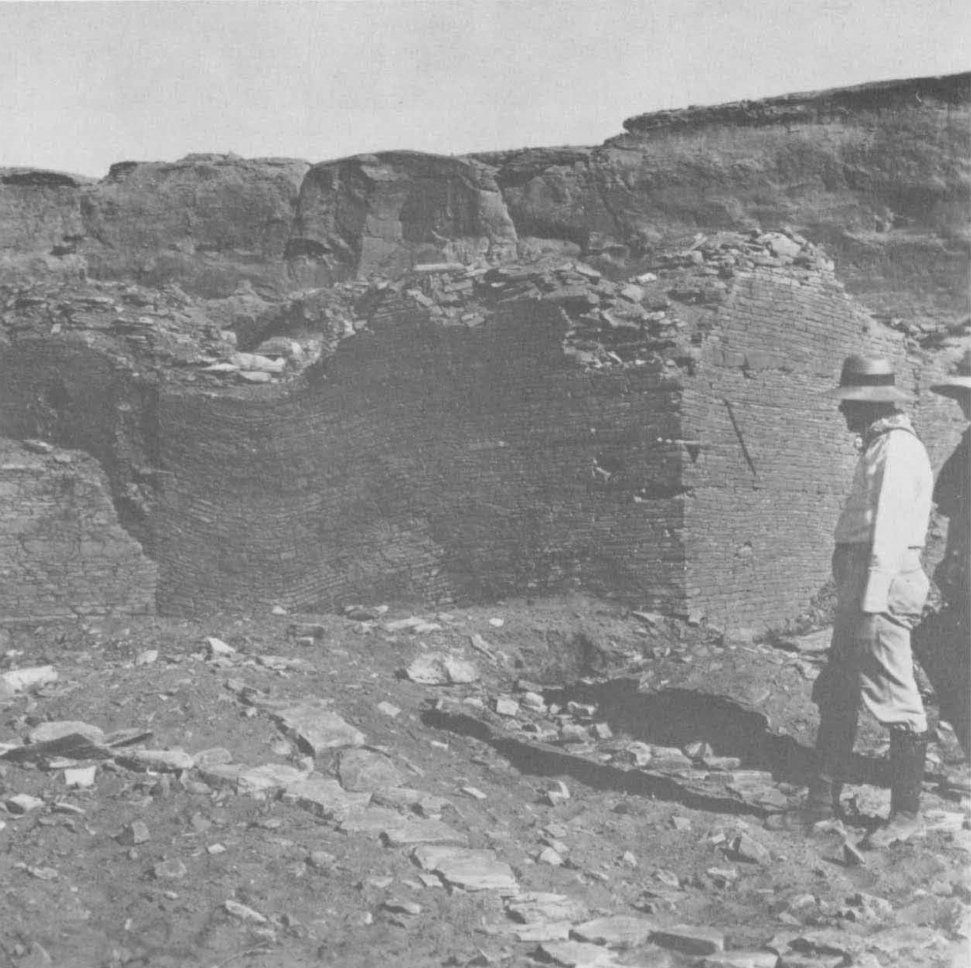
Edgar L. Hewett at Chetro Ketl, 1932

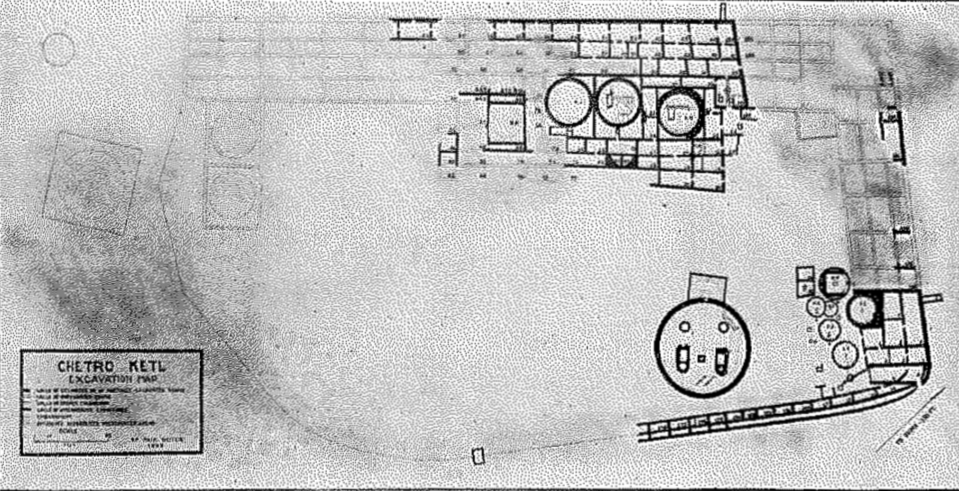
Excavation map of Chetro Ketl by Florence M. Hawley (1934), with great kiva (lower right) and central room block (top center)

The first formal excavation of Chetro Ketl was conducted during 1920 and 1921 by Edgar L. Hewett, director of Chaco Canyon's first archeological field school. He visited the canyon in 1902, and in 1916 he arranged for the School of American Research to participate in excavations at Chetro Ketl with the Royal Ontario Museum and the Smithsonian Institution. He made some preliminary studies at the end of 1916, but World War I caused the delay of his plans. When work resumed in 1920, financial considerations forced the Smithsonian to withdraw its support.

Hewett suspended his research during Judd's 1924–27 excavation of Pueblo Bonito, financed by the National Geographic Society, but returned to Chetro Ketl in 1929 with graduate students from his newly founded Department of Archaeology and Anthropology at the University of New Mexico. He studied the canyon until 1935, and several Chaco scholars worked for or with him during this period, including Gordon Vivian (father of R. Gwinn Vivian), Edwin Ferdon, Paul Reiter, and Florence M. Hawley. Hewett's methods have been widely criticized, and his work judged to have been substandard, particularly in comparison to the work done by the National Geographic Project. He spent several years excavating Chetro Ketl, but never published a detailed account of his research there. Despite this, much is known about his studies from the theses and dissertations written by students who worked with him.

Hawley began her studies with Hewett in 1929, focusing primarily on dendrochronology and ceramic dating. She spent two summers excavating Chetro Ketl's refuse mound, and demonstrated that charcoal found in it could be used for tree-ring dating. Her 1933 doctoral dissertation showed that the mound's layers represent a reverse stratigraphy. Material from older refuse mounds was often moved and placed on top of contemporary debris. It was then covered by layers of daily waste before still more older debris was piled on top. This resulted in newer material accumulating at the base of the pile, and older material accruing near the top. Subsequent excavations indicated that the mound was likely created by more than typical household waste; numerous layers of it are composed of refuse from large-scale feasts that included the ritualistic smashing of pottery. Hawley worked at the site through 1933, and in Fagan's opinion her comparison dating of masonry walls and potsherds significantly enhanced the study of Chacoan culture. He credits her with aiding the establishment of one of archeology's most accurate chronologies. In 1983, as the only surviving member of Hewett's 1929–33 group of researchers, Hawley noted the difficulties of excavating Chaco Canyon during the Great Depression: "The young archeologists and dendrochronologists of today, struggling to reconstruct Chetro Ketl from the notes, maps, and too scanty publications and incomplete collections of the past, know little of the exigencies which have made their task difficult."

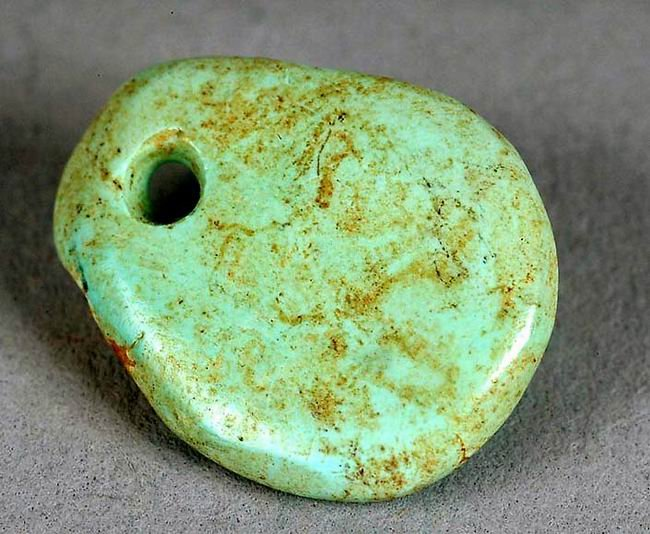
Chacoan turquoise pendant like those found in Chetro Ketl's great kiva, c. 1000–1040

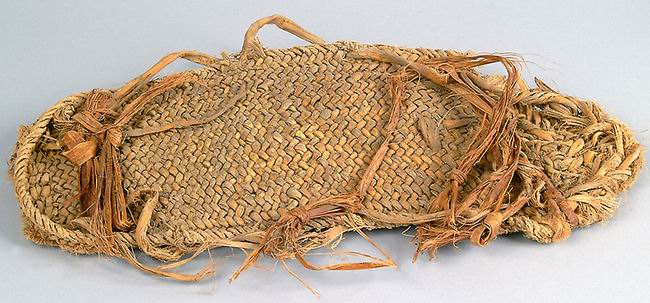
12th-century Chacoan twined sandal

In 1921, Hewett excavated Chetro Ketl's great kiva, where he discovered a more ancient one buried 12 feet (3.7 m) below. He also found several macaw feathers, but no copper bells like those found at Pueblo Bonito. Hewett was surprised at the lack of exotic items at the site, where no human burials have been found. (Note: Human remains were uncovered from Chetro Ketl's refuse mound, but poor documentation in the associated records diminished their provenance and archeological usefulness.) In 1931 and 1932, Reiter and Gordon Vivian discovered caches of turquoise beads and pendants while digging in the great kiva. (Note: The Ancestral Puebloans buried offerings of turquoise during the construction of kivas starting c. 770 CE.) In all, 17,454 beads were recovered from the kiva's buried niches. In 1947, when flood waters from Chaco Wash encroached on Chetro Ketl, Vivian rescued a stash of wooden artifacts from an unexcavated room. Archeologists consider the wooden figures, some of which depict birds, unique in the region. Several black-and-white stone necklaces were also uncovered. Barbara J. Mills, author of Key Debates in Chacoan Archaeology, believes the items represent "evidence of intense ceremonial activity" at Chetro Ketl. Lekson notes that after "spectacular amounts of material" were recovered at Pueblo Bonito, "expectations for Chetro Ketl were undoubtedly high", and although Hewett and his students were ultimately disappointed, he describes the wooden artifacts as "an extraordinary collection". Despite this, scholars continue to regard Chetro Ketl as a place where relatively few items of archeological interest have been uncovered.

Several minerals used for paint pigments were excavated from Chetro Ketl, including charcoal, shale, malachite, iron oxides, hematite, limonite, gypsum, and azurite. Twined sandals, and bones from the ferruginous hawk and the great horned owl have been found there. The relative lack of exotic material uncovered at Chetro Ketl, such as shells, copper bells, and macaw feathers, may indicate its lesser importance compared to Pueblo Bonito, where those items have been found in abundance. Because Chetro Ketl has only been partially excavated definitive conclusions remain elusive. (Note: A lobatus galeatus shell, which is rare in Chaco Canyon, was uncovered at Chetro Ketl.) In 1937, W. W. Postlethwaite, who had for three seasons directed Hewett's excavation of Chetro Ketl's great kiva, oversaw the final work at the site conducted by the University of New Mexico and the School of American Research. (Note: A long period of nearly continuous study at Chaco Canyon ended in 1965, when Vivian and colleague Tom Mathews published their findings on the great house Kin Kletso.)

=== Artifacts ===
Lekson describes Chetro Ketl as "notoriously sterile", and states that "it is impossible to say how much material was recovered during the many seasons" of excavation there. Field notes indicate that while several major artifacts, including baskets, sandals, painted wood fragments, digging sticks, arrow heads, and crushed pots were found at the great house, the whereabouts of most of these items is "one of the great archaeological mysteries of the Southwest". He ascribes the "almost total disappearance" of the Chetro Ketl artifacts, which were viewed as unimpressive in comparison to those found at Pueblo Bonito, as a consequence of Hewett's flippant treatment of the collection. The Museum of New Mexico holds several items excavated from Chetro Ketl, including pieces of turquoise, a black-on-white pottery canteen, and a fourteen-foot-long stone and shell necklace.

== Description ==
External images
- Chaco Research Archive: Chetro Ketl
- Interactive map
- Image gallery

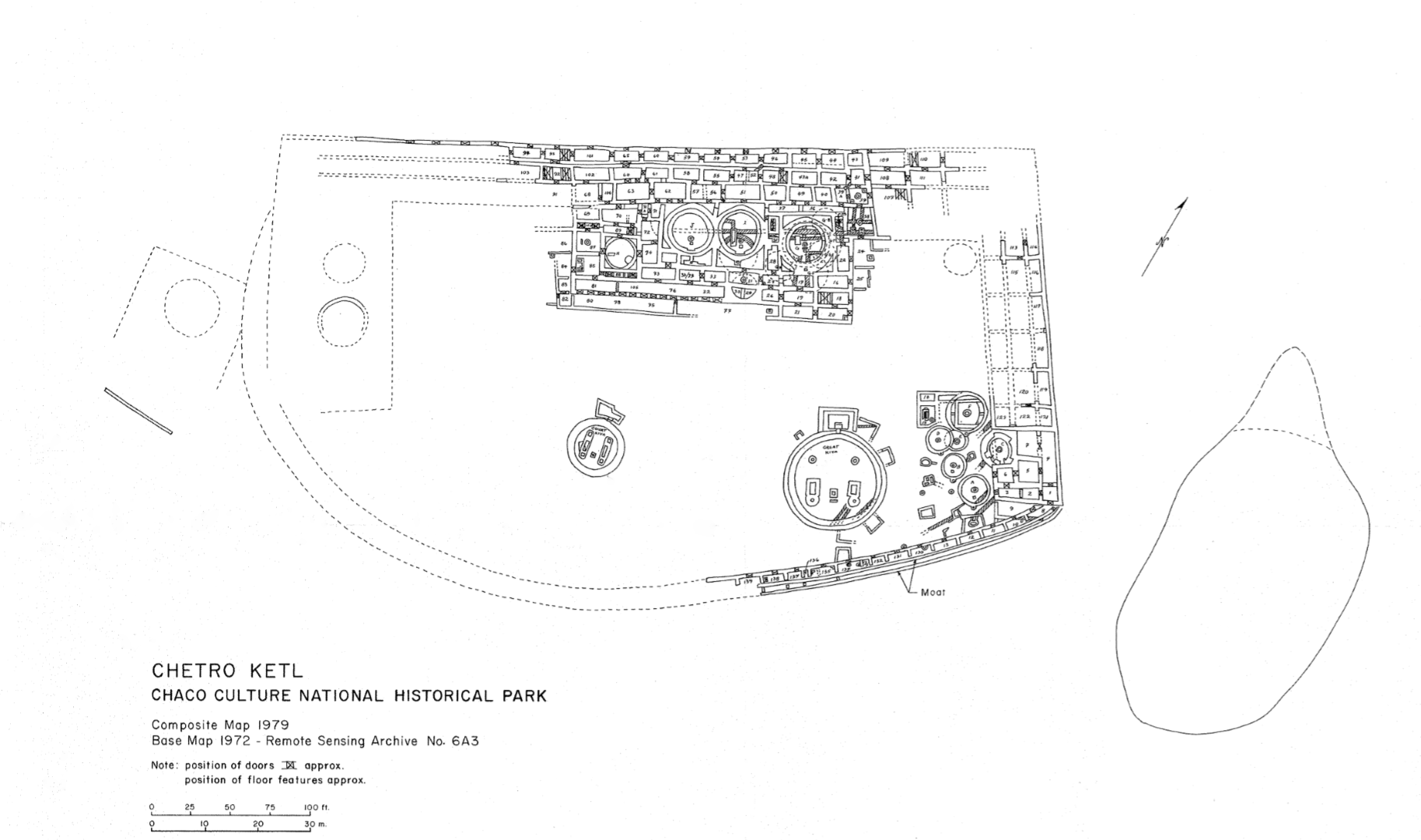
National Park Service map of Chetro Ketl

Chetro Ketl contained approximately 400 rooms and was the largest great house by area in Chaco Canyon; sections of it reached four stories, three of which remain. (Note: Lekson, Windes, and Fournier estimate that Chetro Ketl was five stories at its tallest, but two levels are now buried below the canyon floor.) The building covers nearly 3 acres (1.2 ha), with approximately half of that in the enclosed plaza, which was lined by wings of rooms to the north, east, and west. Chetro Ketl's perimeter is 1,540 feet (470 m). The great house is a D-shaped structure; its east-facing wall is 280 feet (85 m) long, and the north wall is more than 450 feet (140 m) long. Rooms were constructed three-deep and three or four stories tall, and terraced so that the ground level that faced the plaza in the center of the building was one-story.

Chetro Ketl had twelve kivas: two large ones in the west wing plaza, one of which is a great kiva, and ten in the central room block, including one known as a tower kiva. The refuse mound was 205 feet (62 m) long, 120 feet (37 m) wide, and 20 feet (6.1 m) tall; it contained between 219,000 and 275,000 cubic feet (6,200 and 7,800 m^{3}) of debris. Chetro Ketl's plaza is raised above the surrounding land by 5.75 feet (1.75 m), a feature that is unique in the canyon, where the plazas of all other great houses are level with the surrounding landscape.

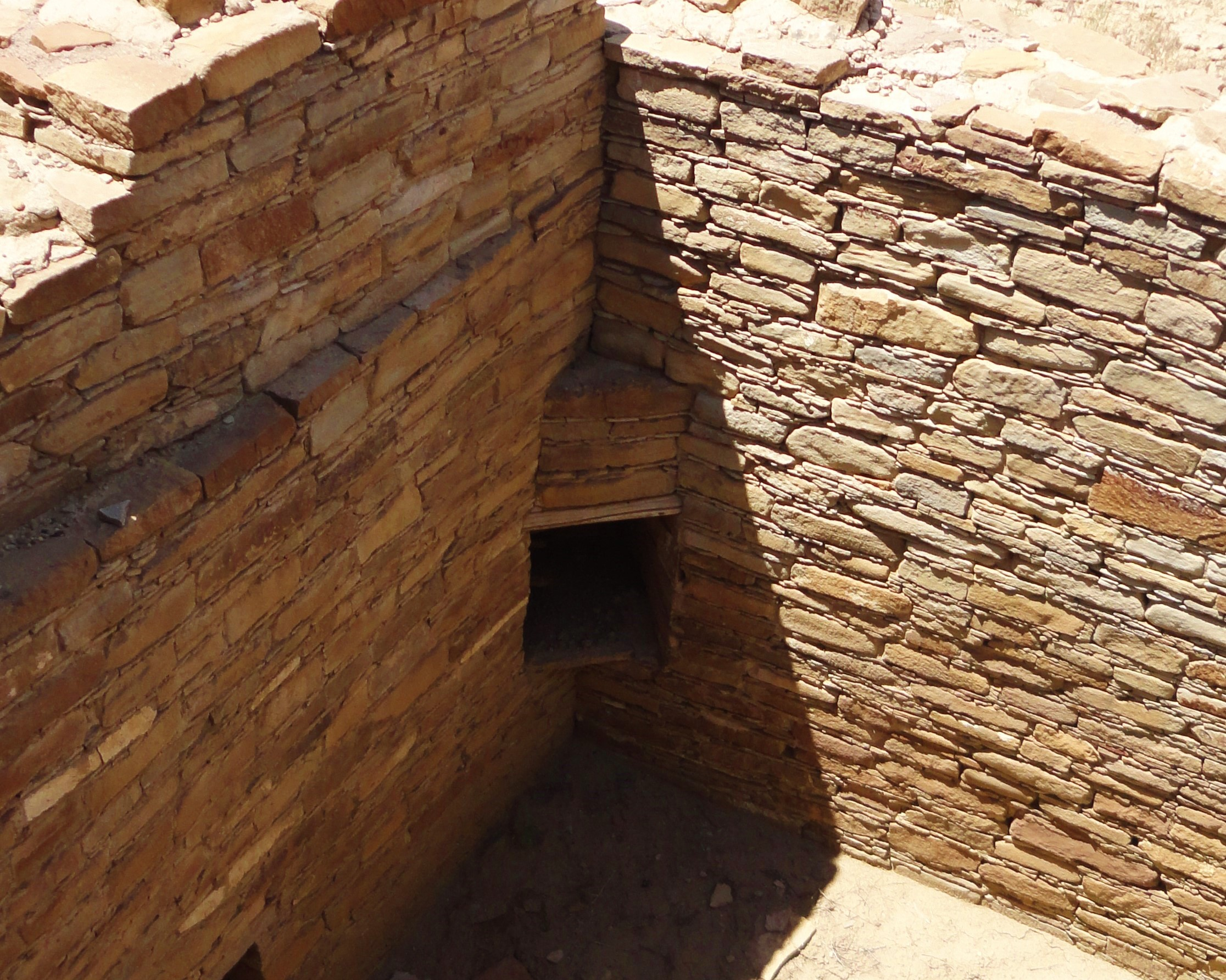
Corner doorway at Chetro Ketl

At the front of the building is a mysterious feature consisting of two closely spaced parallel walls that archeologists call "the moat". The long and narrow chamber runs along the outside wall, and appears to have been backfilled around the same time that the plaza was raised, c. 1070. The original purpose of the feature is unknown, but tunnels between rooms are found in more northerly Puebloan sites, and the moat would have facilitated movement between Chetro Ketl's wings.

A narrow slit along the north wall's outside surface indicates the presence of an ancient balcony. There are several rooms attached to the rear of the structure that lack direct access to the main building; these are believed to have been dedicated to community storage. Chetro Ketl and Pueblo Bonito are the only two great houses in Chaco Canyon with corner doorways.

=== Great kiva ===
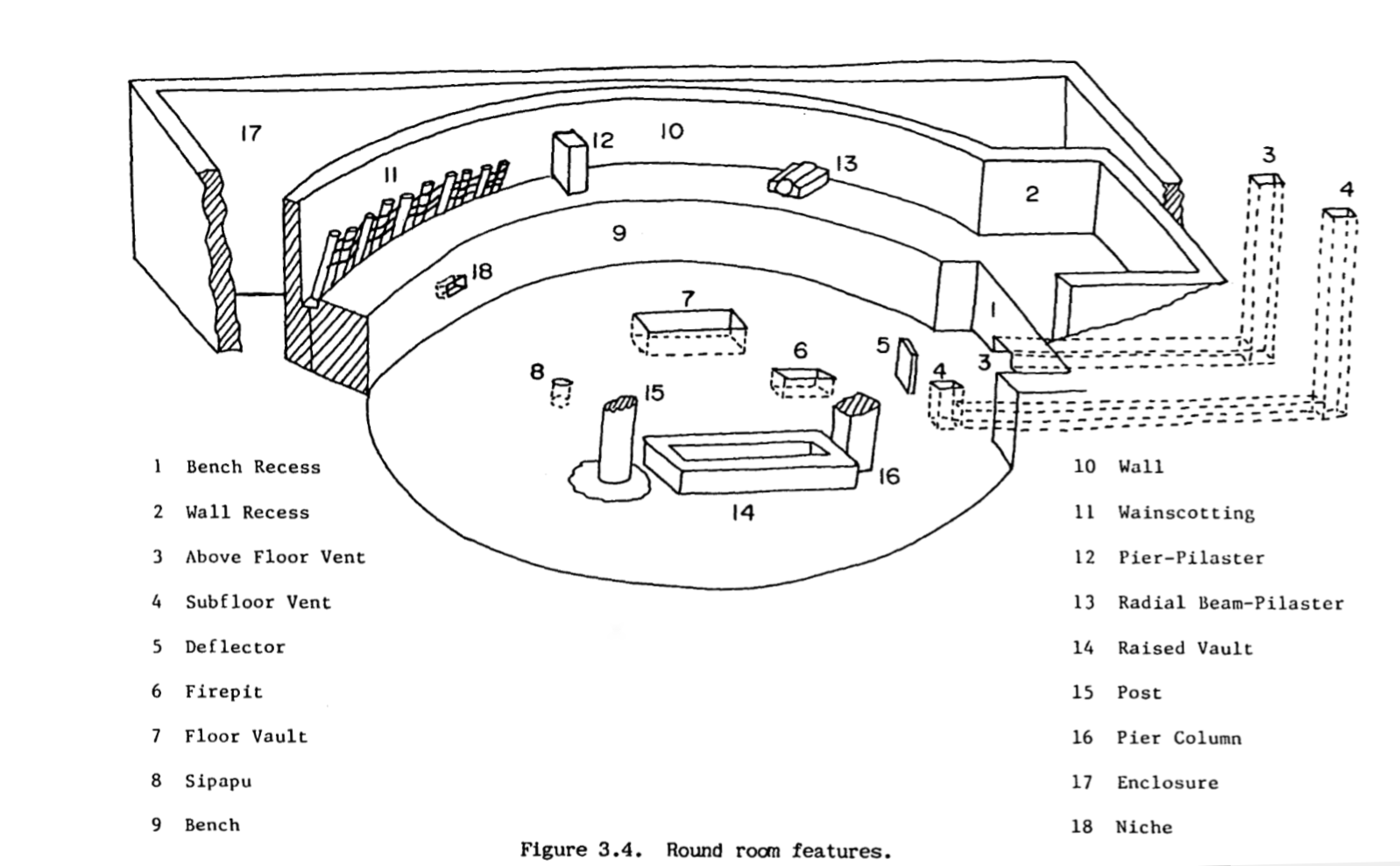
Chacoan round room features

Great kivas are always much larger and deeper than Chaco-style kivas. Whereas the walls of great kivas always extend above the surrounding landscape, the walls of Chaco-style kivas are flush with the surrounding landscape. Chaco-style kivas are often found incorporated into the central room blocks of great houses, but great kivas are always separate from core structures. Great kivas almost always have a bench that encircles the inner space, but this feature is not found in Chaco-style kivas. Great kivas also tend to include floor vaults, which may have served as foot drums for ceremonial dancers, but Chaco-style kivas do not.

Whereas many of the great kivas in Chaco Canyon are located adjacent to or isolated from their associated great house, Chetro Ketl's, which is 62.5 feet (19.1 m) in diameter, lies within the pueblo's walls. The earliest and lowest floor lies 15 feet (4.6 m) below the current plaza surface. The present floor of the kiva is on average 9.25 feet (2.82 m) below. Several peripheral rooms abutted the structure, which is located in the southeast corner of the space; a smaller round room, known as the Court Kiva, lies 98 feet (30 m) to the west, in the plaza's south-central area. The Court Kiva began as a Chaco-style kiva, but was later remodeled to include several of the defining features of a great kiva.

Chetro Ketl's great kiva

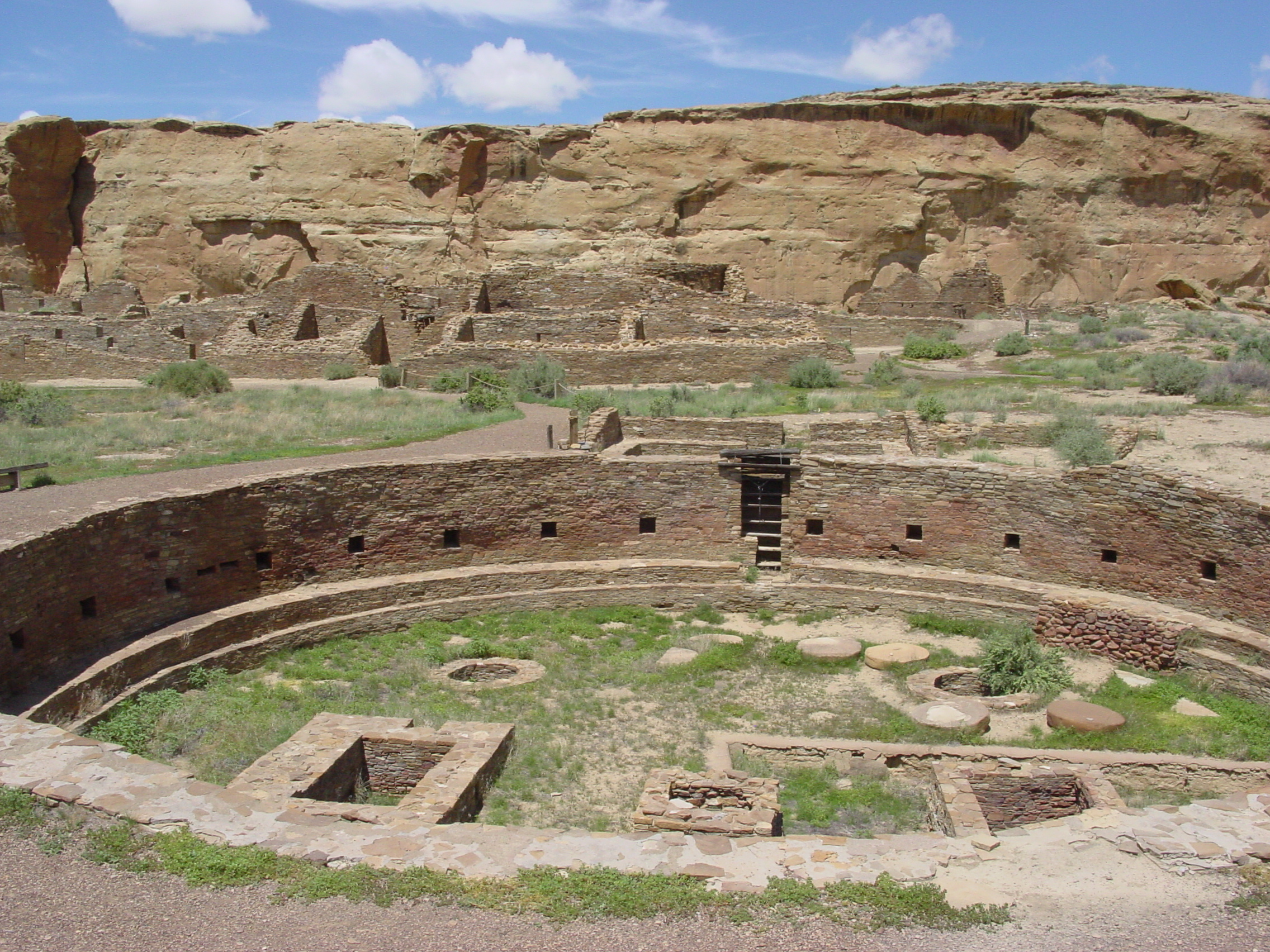
From the south

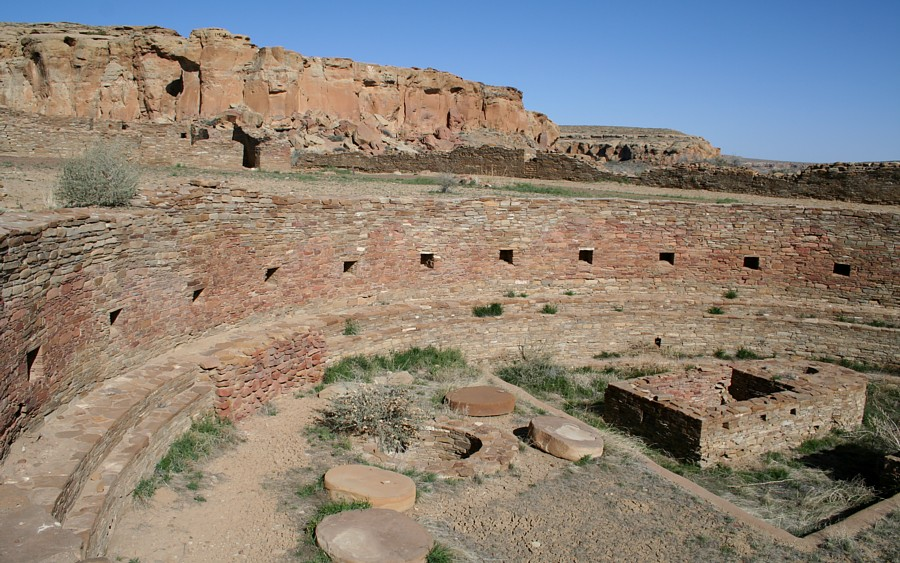
Facing east

The outer walls of the great kiva are 2.5 feet (0.76 m) to 3 feet (0.91 m) thick, and date to 1062–1090. Hawley identified the masonry as Type III, with a crude Type IV veneer covering the bench that postdates the final construction period (1100–16). An 18 foot (5.5 m) by 10 foot (3.0 m) antechamber is attached to the north end of the space; the passageway between them contained a stairway that rose 8 feet (2.4 m) in nine steps from the kiva floor.

Though few remains of it were found, the great kiva's roof was most likely flat rather than domed, as was typical of smaller kivas in the canyon. It was supported by four large posts, upon which four more beams were attached. This formed the roof's main structure, which was covered with a layer of secondary beams, then juniper splints and bark, before being finished with clay. It is not known if the roofs of great kivas were constructed level with the exterior walls or raised above them, but it is believed that the space between the floor and the roof in Chetro Ketl's great kiva was probably not much more than what would be required for average standing height, approximately 5 to 6 feet (1.5 to 1.8 m).

Thirty-nine crypts, measuring approximately 1 foot (0.30 m) in height, 1.1 feet (0.34 m) wide, and 1.25 feet (0.38 m) deep, have been uncovered in the great kiva. They are spaced approximately 5.3 feet (1.6 m) apart and located around the inner circumference of the outer wall. Some artifacts have been recovered from the crypts, but their purpose is unknown; they may have been shelves or specialized altars. A large bench, measuring 3.33 feet (1.01 m) wide by 2.75 feet (0.84 m) tall, encircles the inside of the space. A firebox, measuring 4.83 feet (1.47 m) by 5.3 feet (1.6 m) and 1.6 feet (0.49 m) tall, was located 5 feet (1.5 m) south of the center of the kiva, and a fire screen that helped supply draft air was located 5 feet (1.5 m) away from the firebox.

=== Colonnade ===
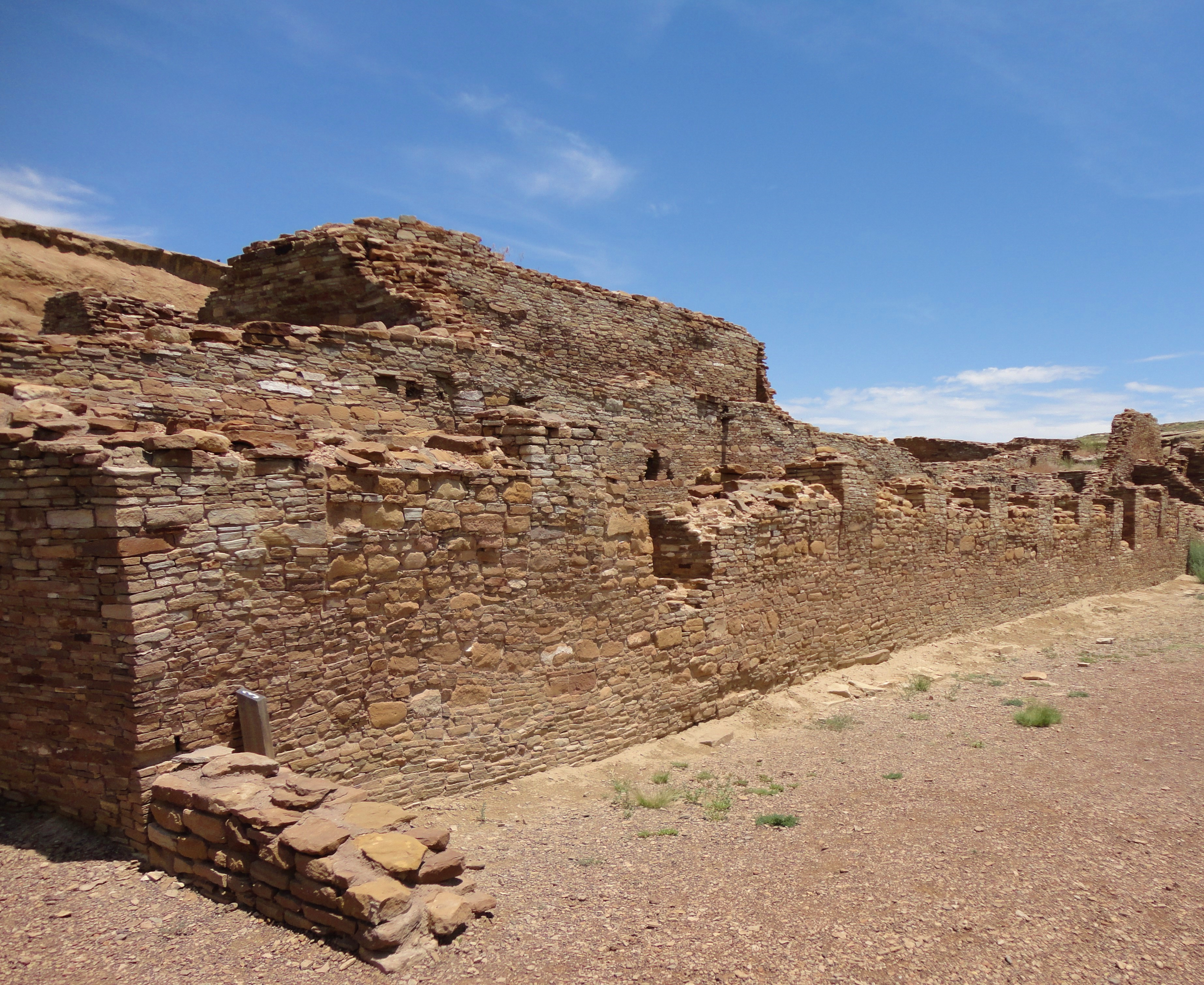
The colonnade at Chetro Ketl (front), with the tower kiva (background)

The site contains a colonnade that Lekson, Windes, and Fournier describe as "prominent, even dominating within the plaza", and "possibly the defining form at Chetro Ketl or even at Chaco." It is not only unique to Chaco Canyon, but also to Ancestral Puebloan architecture as a whole. The nearest similar structure is located more than five hundred miles away at Casas Grandes, in northwestern Mexico. Constructed sometime after 1105, the plaza-facing columns were among the last additions to Chetro Ketl. The colonnade's placement and orientation to the canyon indicate that it was intended to be viewed from inside the building. It was later filled in with masonry to accommodate additional living space. It was 93 feet (28 m) long and contained thirteen columns.

Several scholars have detected a Mesoamerican influence in the feature; Ferdon described it as a "column-fronted gallery" that was "wholly untraditional" in Ancestral Puebloan architecture. He proposed that it was inspired by a Quetzalcoatl cult whose traditions were brought to the region by pochteca traders. In his opinion the influence can also be seen in the site's tower kiva. Lekson, Windes, and Fournier believe the architectural parallels between the colonnade at Chetro Ketl and structures in Mexico "are probably attributable to the adoption of Mesoamerican symbols appropriated by the flow of ideas carried by merchants". In their opinion, the connection "may have been the result of an interaction mechanism of indirect contact between nuclear Mesoamerica and Chaco though northwestern Mexico." They believe the colonnade "is a local architectural interpretation of Mexican models, modified to suit local materials and techniques."

=== Agriculture and pottery ===
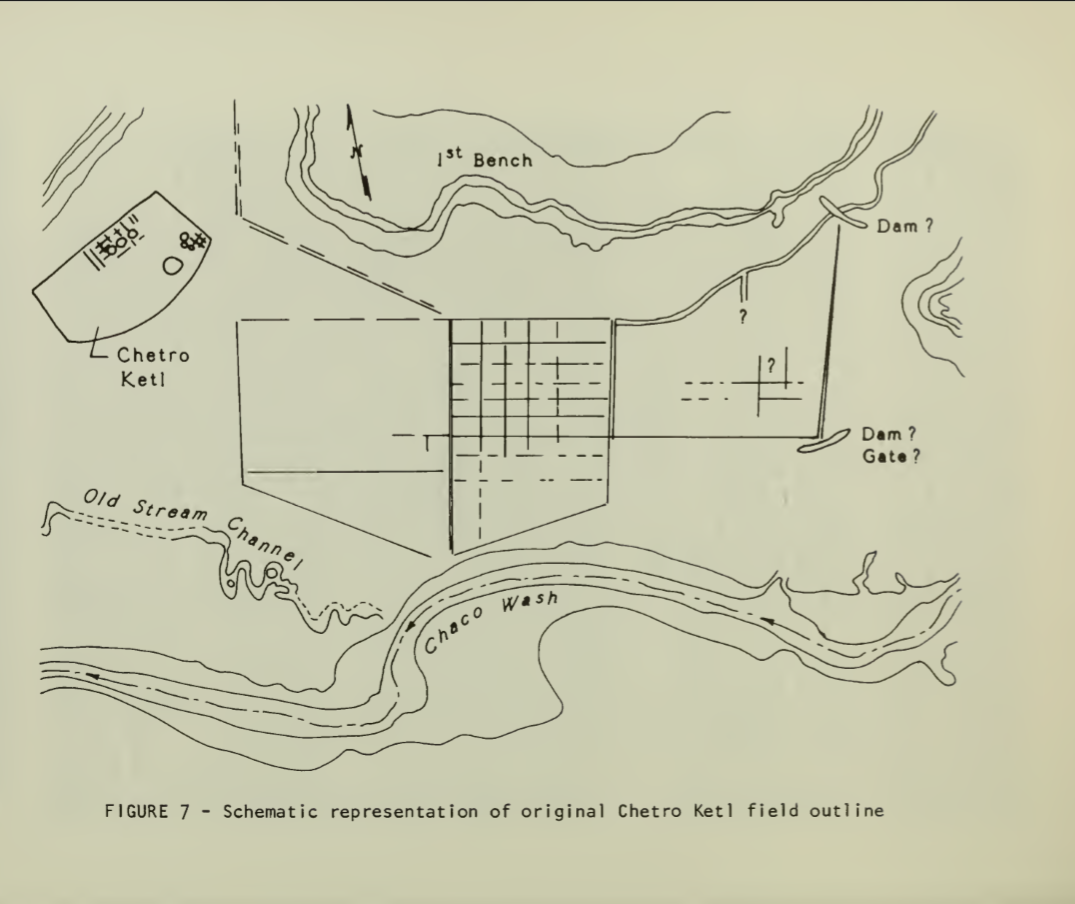
The Chetro Ketl field

Chaco Canyon is watered by winter storms and localized summer rains that fill the arroyos. Chaco Wash is deep, and it drains to the water table located 20 feet (6.1 m) below the canyon floor. Farming terraces on the mesa wall behind Chetro Ketl may have been used for growing specialized crops such as tobacco, and canals running from Pueblo Bonito to Chetro Ketl probably carried rain water. Chetro Ketl's position in downtown Chaco and its proximity to South Gap further aided agricultural efforts near the great house, as summer storms tended to linger in the opening, funneling moisture to the area.

There is no obvious visual evidence of the linear features usually associated with farm fields in the land surrounding Chetro Ketl, but in 1929 aerial black-and-white images by Charles Lindbergh revealed what appeared to be a rectangular plot. In the early 1970s the National Park Service (NPS) developed a remote sensing program to further investigate the area using color video imagery. When enhanced and viewed in black-and-white, the video revealed a well-defined grid pattern within a larger rectangular section of land near Chetro Ketl. The NPS employed two types of ground level remote sensing devices to search for magnetic and soil anomalies in the alluvium of the canyon floor. A soil density study proved inconclusive, but a magnetometer identified a rectangular feature 50 by 65 feet (15 by 20 m), roughly the same size as those seen in Lindbergh's aerial photographs. The NPS researchers proposed that water had deposited iron-bearing clays in the plots, with the center showing the strongest magnetic evidence. Subsequent comparisons with older data reinforced their conclusion. They determined that had the plots been under heavy alluvium they would not have been detected.

In Vivian's opinion, the Chetro Ketl field represents one of the best examples of Chacoan farming. Approximately 20 acres (8.1 ha) of land were divided into 42 plots measuring 75 by 45 feet (23 by 14 m), with parallel irrigation canals that supplied water to individual parcels. Several scholars have disputed this interpretation, suggesting that the area may instead be the location of an unfinished great house, or it could have been used for mixing mortar or raising frogs and freshwater shrimp. Soil analysis indicates that the field received water from both Chaco Wash and side canyons. Twenty-three similar fields have been detected in Chaco Canyon, but Chetro Ketl's is the only one that has been extensively surveyed. Archeologists estimate that between 2,600 and 3,600 acres (1,100 and 1,500 ha) of arable land was available to Chacoan farmers, whose crops could support approximately 4,000 people. Archeomagnetic analysis indicates the Chetro Ketl field was last used in 1250.

Studies of ancient corn cobs found at Pueblo Bonito suggest that large quantities of the foodstuff were imported to the canyon from the Chuska Mountains, 50 miles (80 km) west, and the San Juan and Animas River areas, 56 miles (90 km) north. Archeologists believe the corn was imported to help feed groups of laborers during large-scale construction projects. The corn cobs are longer, with more rows of kernels, than most examples from the region. This may indicate genetic differences, superior growing conditions, or "preferential watering" of crops intended for consumption at Chaco Canyon.

The black-on-white painted pottery found at Chaco Canyon originated from various places throughout the Four Corners region, including the Red Mesa Valley, northeastern Arizona, the San Juan River, and the Chuska Valley, forty miles distant. Whereas most of the gray ware, non-decorative or utility, pottery uncovered at Puebloan sites was produced locally, more than half of the vessels found in the canyon were imported from places like the Chuska Valley, which supplied the majority of utility pottery found in the region.

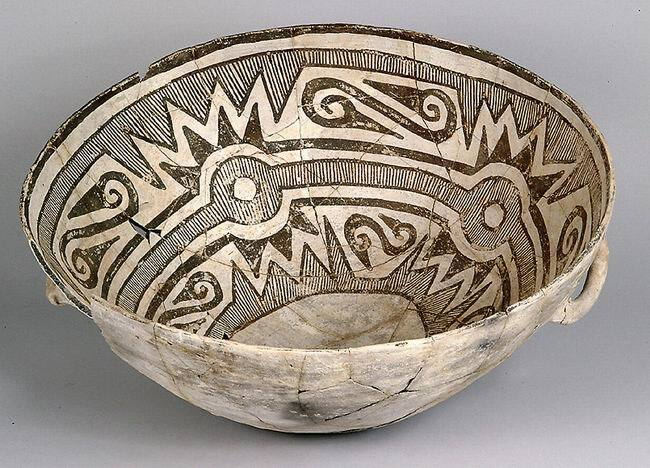
An example of McElmo black-on-white pottery found at Chaco Canyon

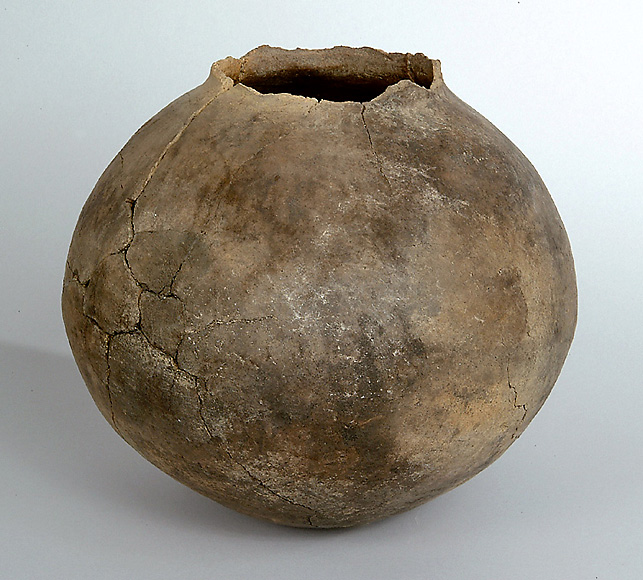
Chacoan grey ware

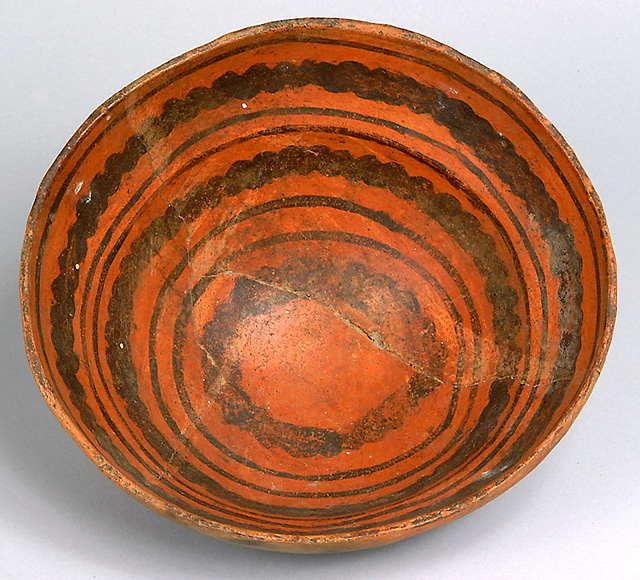
Kayenta orange trade ware

Red wares were imported from southeastern Utah until c. 1000, when the Chacoans switched to orange ware products originating from northeastern Arizona, near Kayenta. After 1000, almost no pottery was fired in the canyon, but was instead produced in outlying communities with access to a steady supply of firewood for their kilns. During the period from 1030 to 1100, significantly more pottery was imported to the canyon than before. The extensive Puebloan trade network that dispersed stoneware products throughout the region suggests that, although evidence of large-scale production is lacking, proficient local artisans supplied distant communities as well as their own.

=== Purpose ===
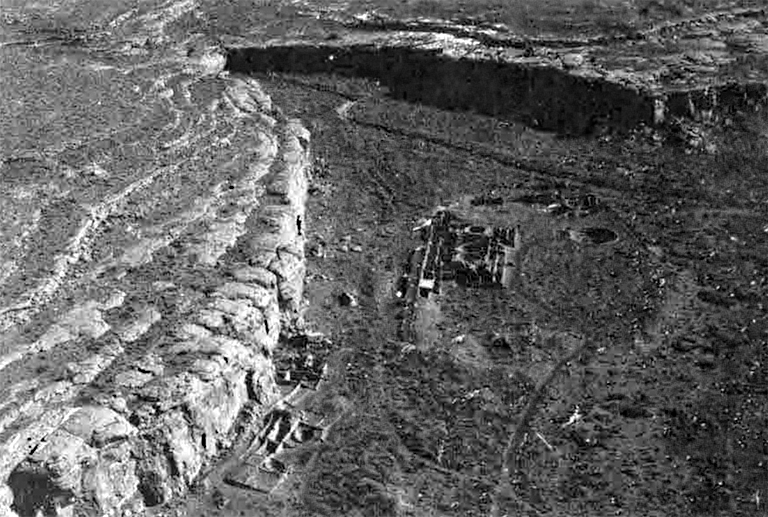
Chetro Ketl from the west, 1981

Lekson believes that Chetro Ketl was most likely not occupied by scores of families, and in that sense was not a pueblo as early archeologists had concluded. He also notes that, while most if not all round rooms in the canyon have traditionally been labeled as kivas, the smaller ones found at Chetro Ketl were most likely not kivas, "but the final and most elaborate form of the pit-house", which had served as the region's primary housing structure during the five hundred years prior to the settlement of Chaco Canyon. He proposed that Chacoan great houses were royal palaces; Chetro Ketl was a residence for the elite, but also a central location for governance, storage, craftworks, ritual, and bureaucracy. Many scholars disagree because they assume "palaces imply states", and "it is generally accepted that no Native state ever existed" north of Mexico. In his opinion, the view that palaces cannot exist outside states is misguided, and societies like Chaco may have achieved comparable political complexity on a smaller than typical scale. He considers the political "glass ceiling" an "almost racist" remnant of early archeologists who assumed Native American political sophistication was, by definition, limited to "chiefdoms" and not capable of attaining statehood.

The consistent lack of artifacts and features in excavated Chacoan rooms suggests they were used primarily for grain storage, but because their combined areas appear to exceed what would reasonably have been needed for foodstuffs – a large crop of corn from all the arable land near Chaco would fit into two rows of rooms at Chetro Ketl – this interpretation lacks support amongst archeologists. Because so many of these rooms are featureless interior spaces that lie below several stories, the scale of their construction may have been motivated by what architects call "massing"; building structures with the primary intention of impressing onlookers.

The rooms of Chetro Ketl may have served as storage space for ritual objects, and the great house may have been occupied primarily by groups of priests, also housing pilgrims during community events, when the population of the canyon increased dramatically. Judge notes that these pilgrims probably assisted in the construction of Chetro Ketl, thus "confirming their affiliation with the larger ritual alliance". The area between Chetro Ketl and Pueblo Bonito may have served as a central location for ceremonies. Because water was crucial to their survival, Chacoan rituals most likely focused on prayers for rain.

== Chacoan system ==
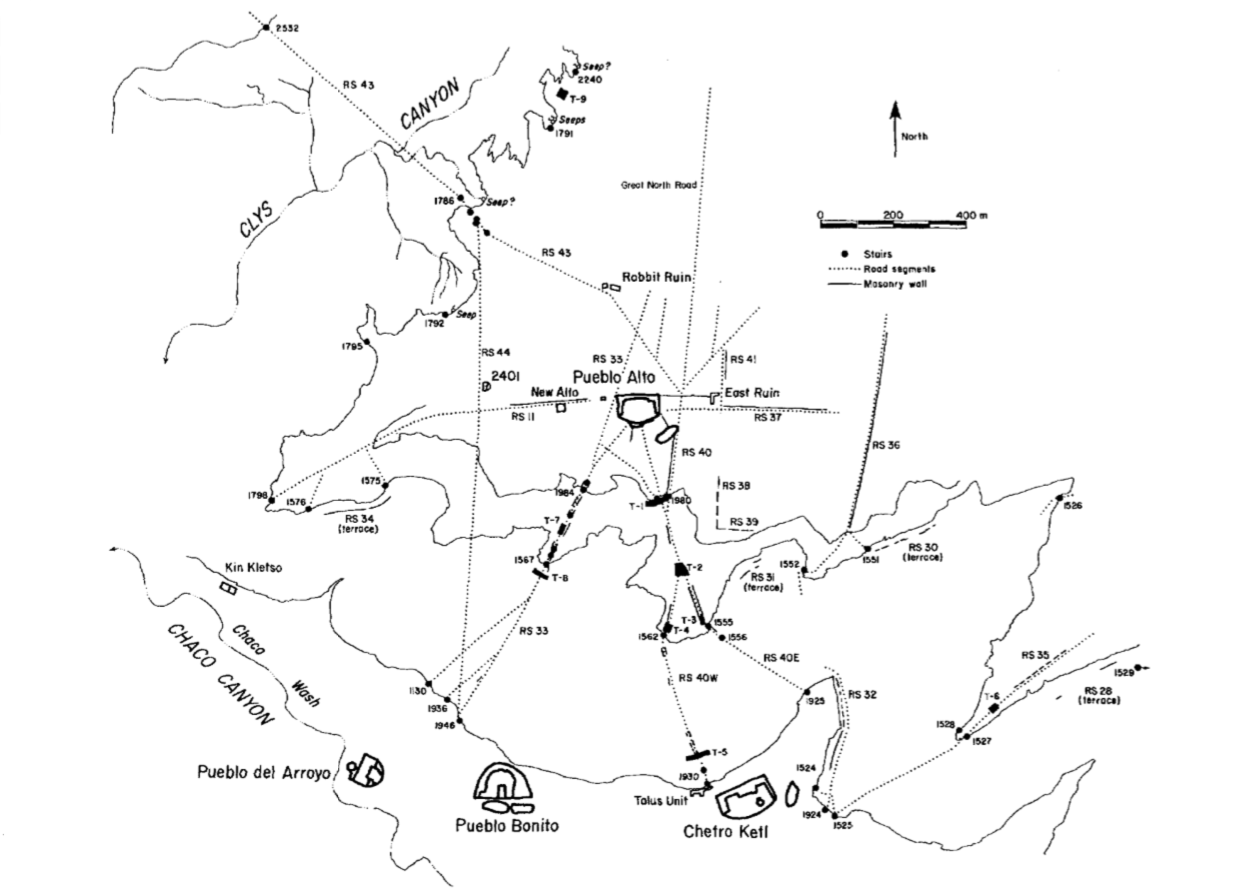
The road network around the Pueblo Alto community

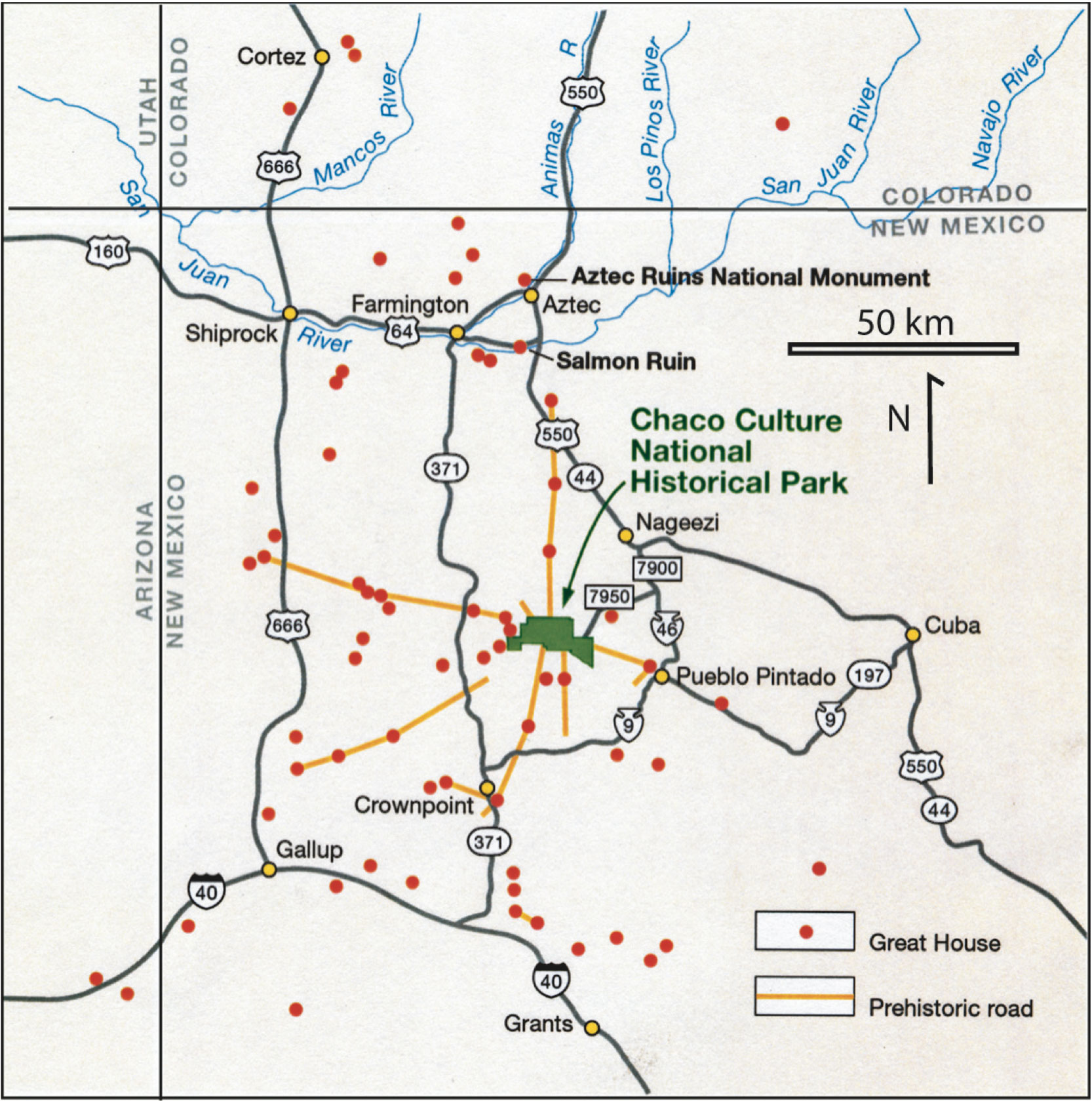
Prehistoric roads and great houses in the San Juan Basin

A long-distance communication system that used smoke and mirrors existed in the region, and direct lines of sight have been established between Pueblo Alto, Huérfano Mountain in northern New Mexico, and Chimney Rock Pueblo in southern Colorado. Messages could have been relayed between these three points within minutes. On the mesa behind Chaco Canyon is an ancient road that runs north from Chetro Ketl, then northward along the east side of Pueblo Alto before joining with the Great North Road. (Note: Pueblo Alto is central to Chaco's ruins, and although the greater significance of the structure is unknown, it housed an estimated five to twenty families during the late 12th and early 13th centuries.) The Pueblo Alto road network functioned between 1050 and 1140. It facilitated access to watering holes, terraced farming areas, and enabled interaction between Pueblo Alto and great houses like Pueblo Bonito and Chetro Ketl. It also led to a community along Escavada Wash. It may have served an important function in the transport of household goods, construction timber, and people throughout the San Juan Basin. (Note: Several scholars have suggested that the structures are not roads, but symbolic linear expressions of Puebloan mythology, where the shipap, or "place of emergence", lies to the north, and the souls of the dead return to the underworld using the North Road.) Several road segments appear to be related to a row of Chetro Ketl's exterior rooms, which are thought to have been community storage space.

In 1982 Robert Powers theorized that the road network "suggests an intercommunity organization and settlement system of regional extent". Because "Chaco Canyon is the convergence point of all presently documented extra-canyon roads", the area may represent a locus of regional control, or "the apex of the hierarchical system". Powers believes that great houses like Chetro Ketl were involved in civic coordination between the canyon sites and outlying communities. In 1993 David R. Wilcox proposed that a state-level society developed at Chaco, with an administrative center at Pueblo Bonito or Chetro Ketl. In a 2003 study of Chacoan artifacts, Frances Joan Mathien stated that the number of warrior-class individuals that would have been needed to support such a state – Wilcox estimated 500–1,000 – precludes his theory, and Wilcox is assuming a "greater Chacoan organizational complexity than any other scholar to date".

Lekson developed a theory called the Chaco Meridian, which is based on architectural similarities between the Ancestral Puebloan sites at Aztec Ruins and Chaco Canyon, and Paquime at Casas Grandes in northern Mexico. He believes the sites were intentionally located on the same approximate line of longitude (107°57'25"), and this indicates a ceremonial connection between them. The Great North Road roughly follows the Chaco Meridian, and many of the ancient roads in the area appear to follow it towards key sites in the basin.

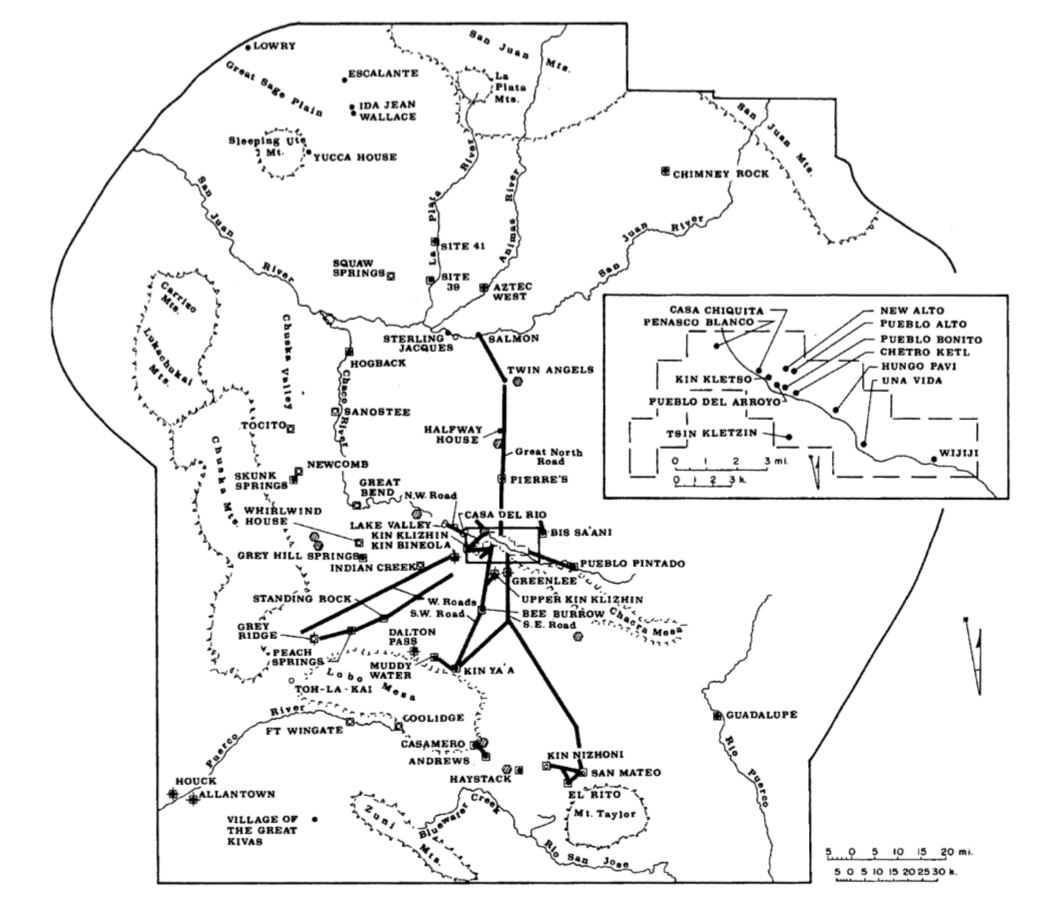
The Chacoan System at its peak development (1050–1175)

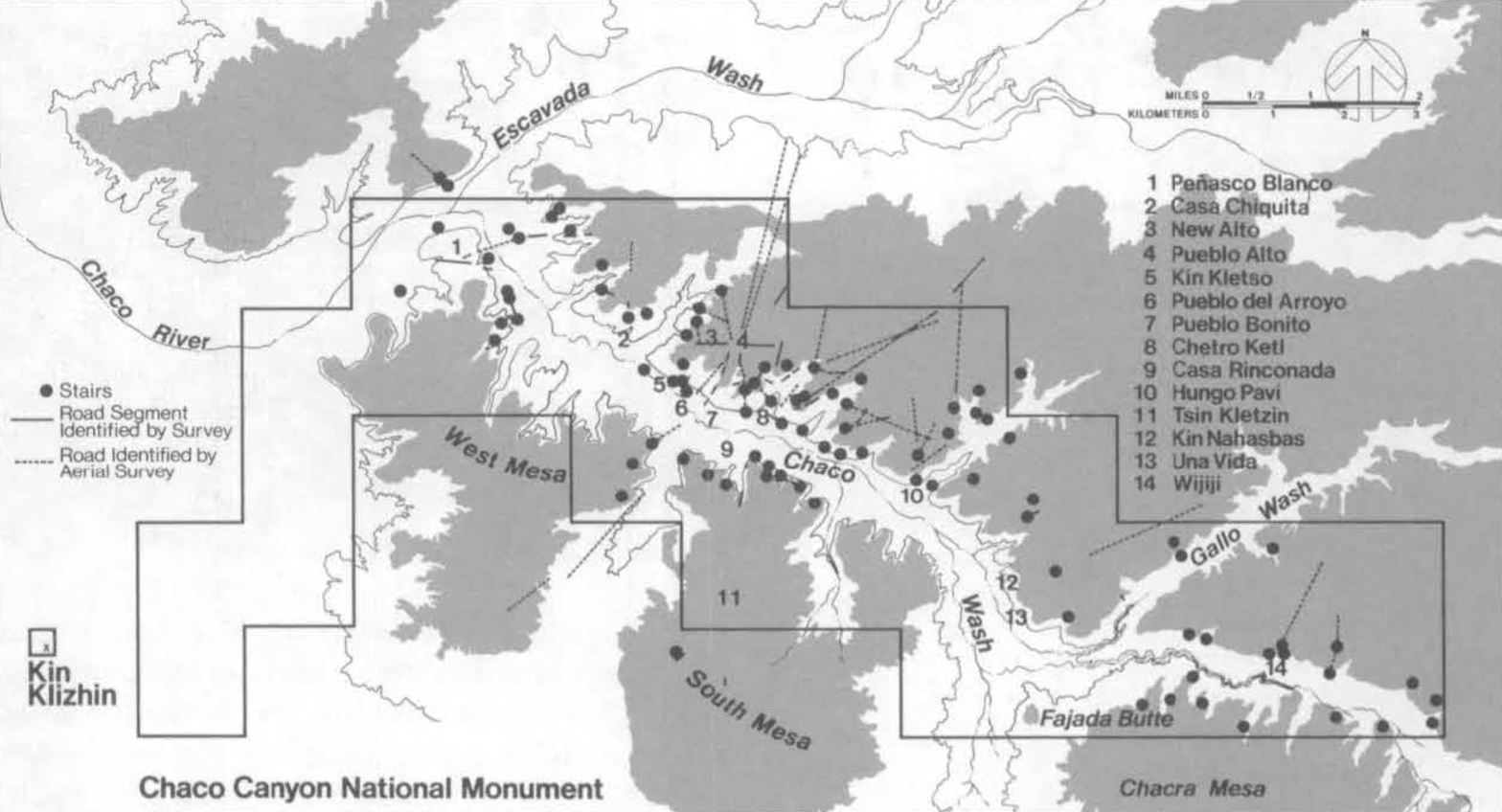
Distribution of roads and stairs near Chaco Canyon

Judge notes that "virtually all researchers recognize a strong ritual component to Chacoan authority and view the Chacoans as having formed a regional center with a compelling and integrating body of ceremony at its core." Preliminary population estimates for the canyon ranged as high as ten thousand people, but in his opinion a figure closer to two thousand is more likely. (Note: Lekson believes the population of Chaco Canyon never exceeded three thousand people.) He views Chaco as a ceremonial center and a "place of ritual architecture", which pilgrims from throughout the San Juan Basin's two hundred great house communities would visit. These pilgrims brought large quantities of goods and raw materials to the canyon, including exotics such as turquoise and shell beads, and also ceramics, timber, and food.

Neutron activation analysis linked an artifact from Chetro Ketl to the Cerrillos Turquoise Mines, located 20 miles (32 km) south of Santa Fe, New Mexico. Analysis of chipped stone from Chetro Ketl's trash mound indicates that more than fifty percent of the chert found there was imported from Washington Pass in the Chuska Mountains, 47 miles (76 km) away. The Chacoans enjoyed a bounty of imports from throughout the San Juan Basin, but little evidence of exports from the canyon has been found. This suggests they were consumers, but not producers or distributors of goods.

Scholars continue to debate whether Chacoan organization was based on primarily political or primarily ritual considerations. Archeological evidence suggests that the residents of great houses like Chetro Ketl were of a higher social class than those living in smaller settlements, which may indicate a systemic inequality that is considered a hallmark of hierarchal political systems. Others view Chaco as an egalitarian society, with an economy driven by its function as the region's ceremonial center. Because there has been little to no modern excavation in the canyon, the question remains largely unanswered. Lynne Sebastian suggests that any analysis based on a strict dichotomy of ritual versus political purpose is inherently misguided, because the Chacoans were most likely deeply influenced by both.

Lekson believes that by the later period (1075 to 1140) "Pueblo Bonito, Chetro Ketl and Pueblo del Arroyo ... together with the numerous other structures in the central canyon, should be considered a coherent analytical settlement unit." He views the structures near South Gap "as a larger settlement of significant complexity" that "when coupled with Chaco's regional centrality and relatively high population density" should be considered "nearly urban". He notes that by the mid-12th century, "Chaco was much closer to being a city than simply a canyon full of independent agricultural towns and villages." At its peak, the Chacoan system covered an estimated 30,000 to 40,000 square miles (78,000 to 104,000 km^{2}), an area roughly the size of Portugal. The population of the region at the beginning of the 11th century was approximately 55,000 people.

== Deterioration and preservation ==
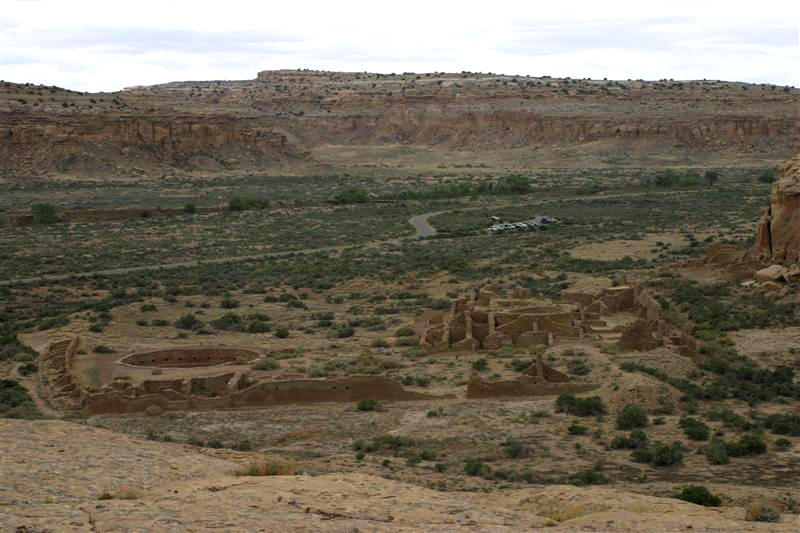
Chetro Ketl from the mesa top, facing west (2008)

Lekson and McKenna note that following the rediscovery of Chetro Ketl in the early 19th century, the building's "pace of dissolution increased alarmingly ... [it] has deteriorated at a faster rate over the last century and a half than in the previous six." Chetro Ketl's wooden elements have proven especially vulnerable in a region that lacks timber, with soldiers, cattlemen, and transients scavenging them from the structure. The rear balcony was present in 1901, but by 1921 the beams had been removed by people scouring the canyon for wood. The process of uncovering beams during excavation has further hastened their deterioration. Chaco Wash, which deepens and widens during summer rain showers, also threatens the canyon's ruins. The once prominent refuse mound has been all but destroyed by repeated trenching and by diverting arroyos near Chetro Ketl. Treasure hunting, livestock grazing, and early National Park Service stabilization efforts also contributed to the degradation of the structure, as have deep excavations that left Chaco Wash prone to flooding. Archeology was responsible for the catastrophic effects of a 1947 flood that destroyed the walls of twenty rooms and collapsed 40 feet (12 m) of the north wall. (Note: Gordon Vivian salvaged more than 180 beams that had been washed from Chetro Ketl during the flood.) It also toppled Chetro Ketl's tallest remnants.

During the late 1980s, a reburial program was undertaken at Chetro Ketl that sought to preserve the structure's original timbers by backfilling portions of the site with soil. Because only a thin layer of overburden was applied, specialized geosynthetic materials were added to help keep the area dry. The program also developed techniques that facilitate the sampling of ancient wood for assessment of deterioration. Lekson and McKenna note, "the visible building is far from pristine. Most walls have undergone generations of structural and cosmetic treatment ... Chetro Ketl is an artifact deteriorating before our eyes. If the reader is inspired to questions that cannot be answered by the present study, be advised that Chetro Ketl's ability to answer in detail is slowly, but surely, disappearing."
