= McElmo Phase =

Prehistoric culture in New Mexico, US

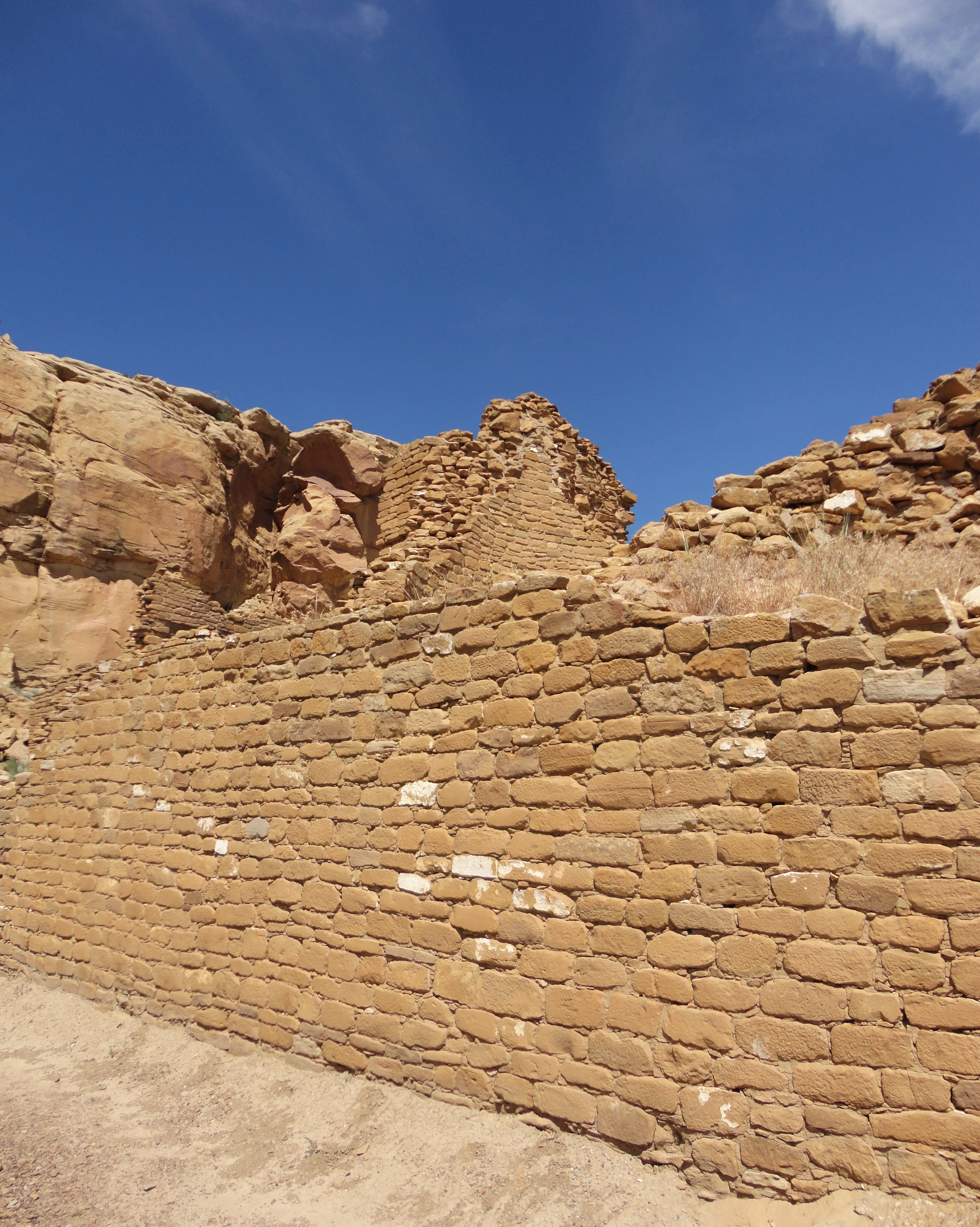
McElmo style masonry at the Chacoan great house Kin Kletso

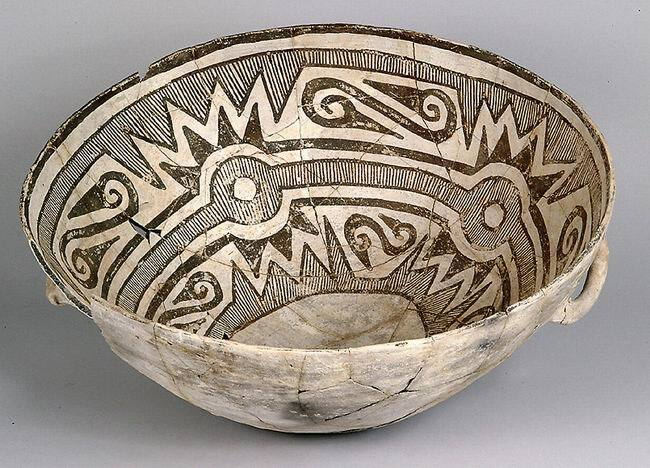
An example of McElmo/Chaco black-on-white pottery

The McElmo Phase refers to a period in the late 11th and early 12th centuries when drastic changes in ceramics and masonry techniques appeared among the people living in Chaco Canyon in what is now New Mexico in the American Southwest.

== Characteristics ==
During this period the Ancestral Puebloans living in the canyon started using painted black-on-white pottery rather than what had been their standard grey ware. The masonry and layout of great houses built during the McElmo phase, which was the last major construction era in the canyon, also differ significantly from those built during the early parts of the Bonito Phase (850 to 1140), which overlaps with the McElmo Phase. Archeologists initially suggested that the McElmo influence was brought to Chaco Canyon by immigrants from Mesa Verde in what is now Colorado, but subsequent research suggests that the developments were of local origin. Archeologist R. Gwinn Vivian notes, "The jury is still out on this question, a problem that poses intriguing possibilities for future work."

== Chetro Ketl ==
A smaller square building, known as the Talus Unit, with a McElmo style floor plan lies just west of Chetro Ketl. The Kiva G complex was constructed using McElmo type masonry, and ceramic evidence uncovered from refuse found in Chetro Ketl indicates a significant McElmo presence. Much of the masonry found in North Block F also appears to be McElmo style.

== See also ==
- Hillside Ruin
