= Hillside Ruin =

Hillside Ruin is a large McElmo style great house and archeological site located near Pueblo Bonito in Chaco Culture National Historical Park, New Mexico, United States. The mostly unexcavated building was occupied during the mid-12th century.
