= Jackson Staircase =

Ancestral Puebloan cliff cut steps

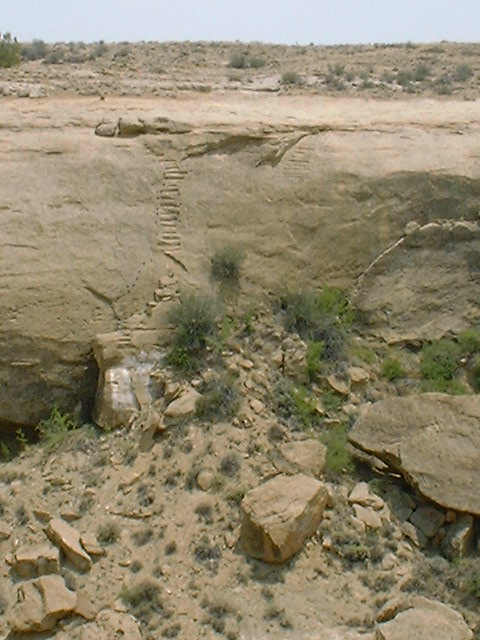
Jackson Staircase

The Jackson Staircase is a pair of Ancestral Puebloan steps cut into the cliff of Chaco Canyon, New Mexico. Located north of Chetro Ketl and east of Pueblo Alto, the stairs gave Chacoans access to the Great North Road. The feature is named after William Henry Jackson, who discovered the stairs in 1877.
