= Chaco Meridian =

Linear alignment of archaeological sites in North America

The Chaco Meridian is a north-south axis on which lie the Ancestral Puebloan sites, Aztec Ruins and Chaco Canyon, as well as Paquime at Casas Grandes in northern Mexico. Archeologist Stephen H. Lekson developed the theorizes that the location of these sites approximately on the same line of longitude (107°57'25") was intentional, and represents a ceremonial and political connection between the sites and is due to migration of the rulers of the Ancestral Puebloan moving their capital city.

Lekson based his theory on architectural similarities between the sites, such as colonnades, T-shaped doors, and room-wide platforms. He also theorized that after the Ancestral Puebloans abandoned Chaco Canyon, they settled directly north at Aztec Ruins during the mid-12th century and then moved south along the meridian to Paquime during the mid-13th century. The Chacoan Great North Road lies near the meridian, starting at Chaco Canyon and ending near Aztec Ruin.

In 2009 in Archeology Magazine, he amended the list of sites on the "meridian" to include Shabik'eschee, which is near Chaco, and Sacred Ridge north of Aztec near Durango, Colorado.

Lekson has received criticism for the theory, primarily from southwestern archaeologists, who claim that the material culture found at these respective sites are far too different to be connected in theory. However, many archeologists agree that Aztec Ruins was inhabited by Chacoans who migrated North from Chaco and moved their capital and lifestyle to Aztec in the late 1200's.

Lekson (2008) noted James Q. Jacobs discovered the meridian. Jacobs named it in 1990.
