= Shabik'eshchee Village =

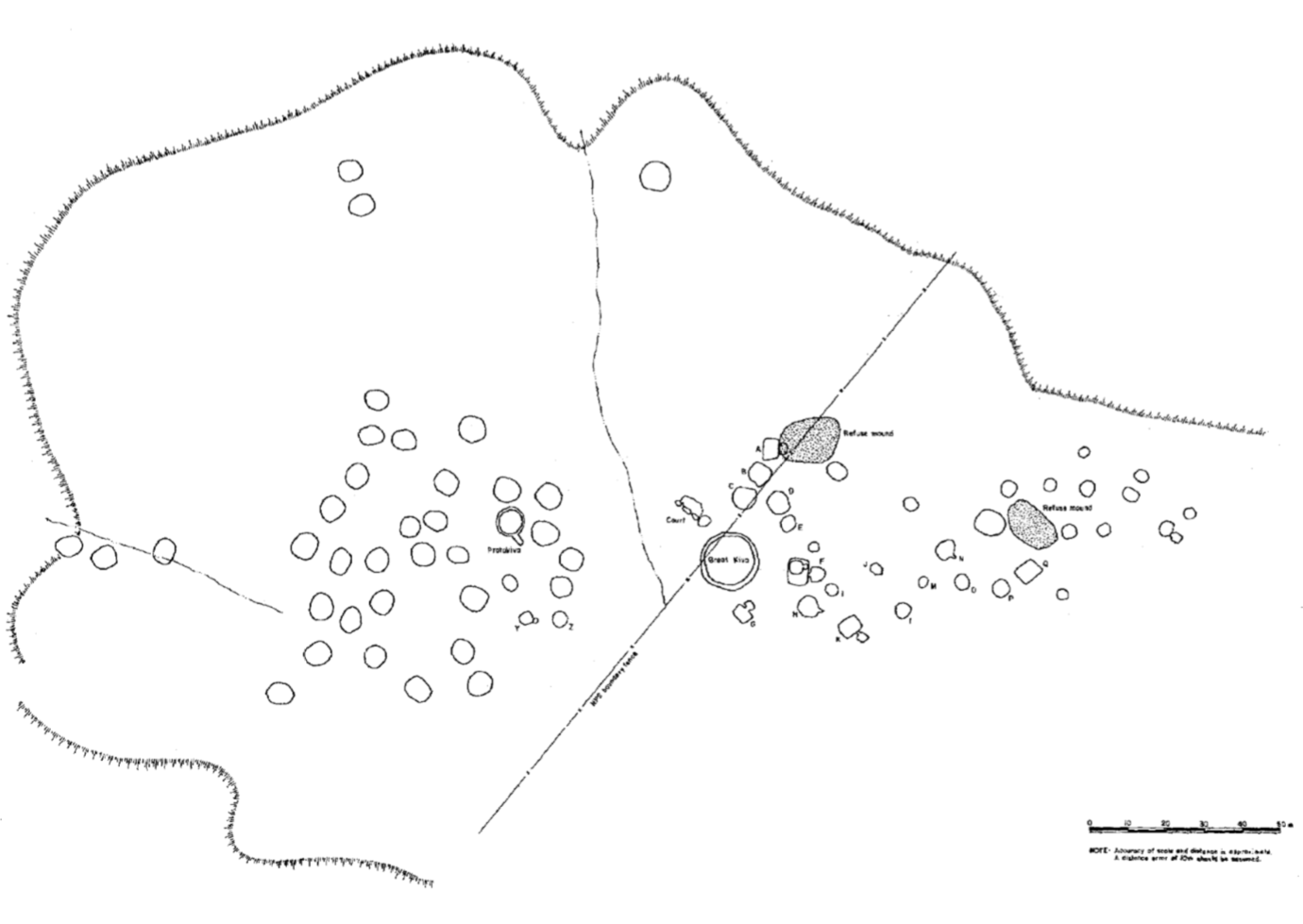
A National Park Service map of Shabik'eshchee Village

Shabik'eshchee Village is an archeological site located atop Chacra Mesa, New Mexico. Covering 20 acres (8.1 ha), the pit-house settlement was occupied c. 500–700 by Basketmaker III peoples. Discovered by Frank Roberts in 1926, the site is one of the earliest settlements in Chaco Canyon. Shabik'eshchee Village contained one hundred pit houses and a community great kiva. It is located approximately 9 miles (14 km) east of Pueblo Bonito.
