= Huérfano Mountain =

Mountain in New Mexico, United States

Coordinates: 36°25′33″N 107°50′42″W

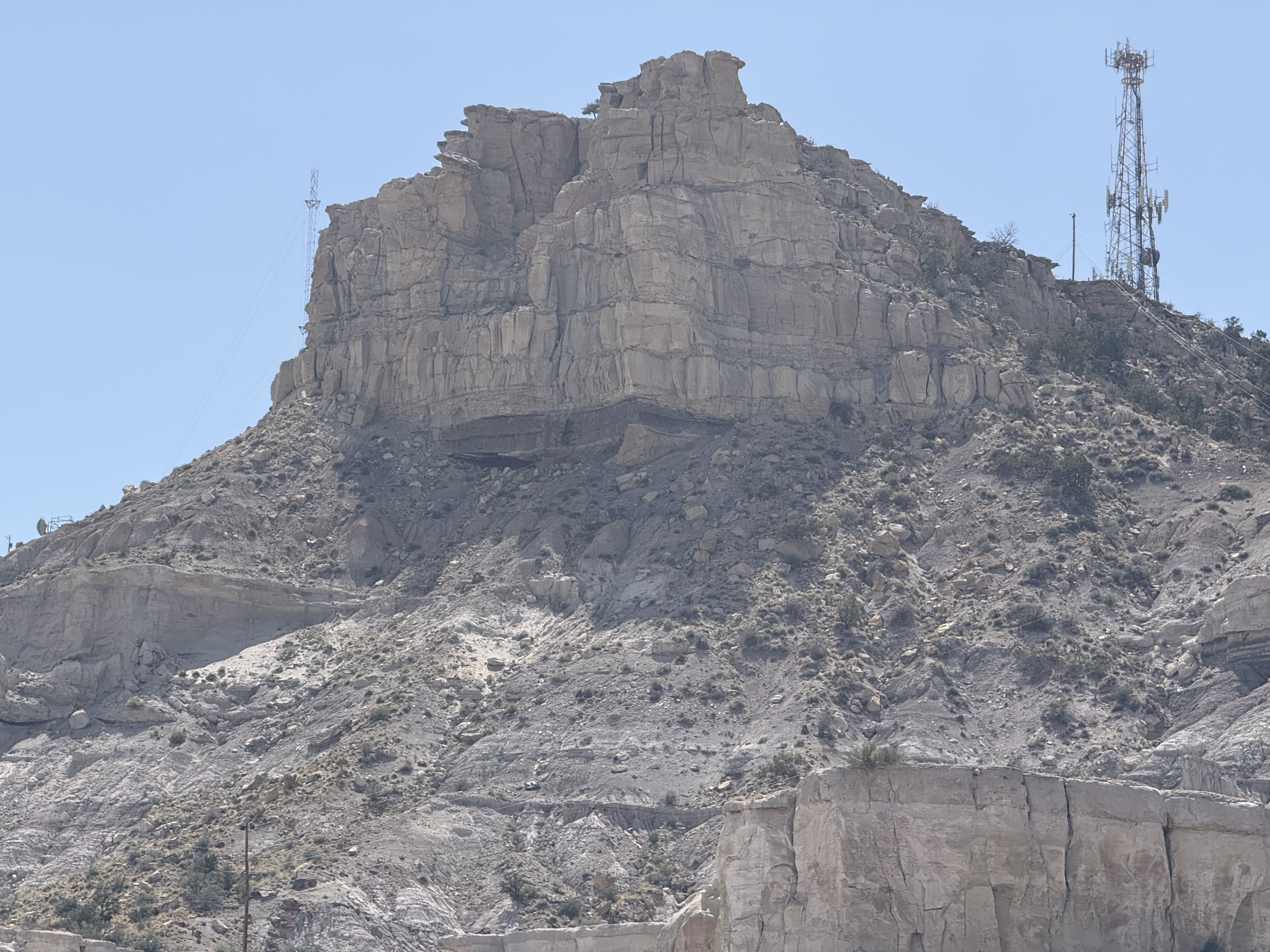
Huérfano Mountain, June 2025

Huérfano Mountain (Navajo: Dził Náʼoodiłii, "People Encircling the Mountain"), also known as Huerfano Mesa and El Huerfano, is one of the six sacred mountains in the mythology of the Navajo people. Located in San Juan County, New Mexico, the 7,470-foot (2,280 m) mountain is believed in Navajo culture to be the home of Yódí Atʼééd (Soft Goods Girl) and Yódí Ashkii (Soft Goods Boy). It is also thought to be the original home of Áłtsé Hastiin (First Man) and Áłtsé Asdzą́ą́ (First Woman).

Located at the center of the Navajo's ancestral homeland, the Dinetah, Huérfano Mountain is composed of Eocene sandstone, and is considered one of two sacred "inner mountains". An Ancestral Puebloan long-distance communication system that utilized smoke and mirrors existed in the region, and direct lines of sight have been established between Huérfano Mountain, Chimney Rock Pueblo, and the Chacoan great house Pueblo Alto. Messages could have been relayed between the three points within minutes.
