= Bonito Phase =

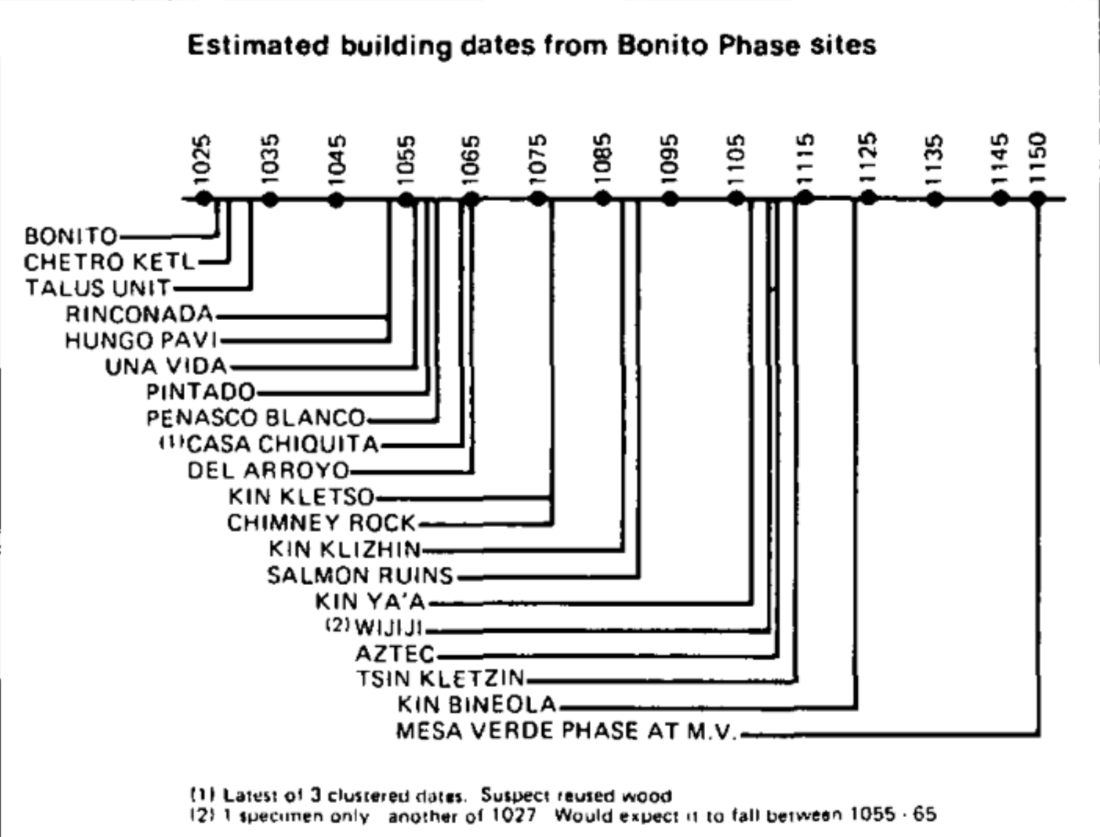
Estimated Bonito Phase building dates, per site

Bonito Phase is an archeological term that refers to the period between 900 and 1140 CE, during which the Ancestral Puebloans in the Chaco Canyon area constructed numerous great houses. The system is divided into three parts: the Early Bonito phase from 900 to 1040; the Classic Bonito phase from 1040 to 1100, and the Late Bonito phase from 1100 to 1140. When the system was created in the 1980s, it was thought that construction at Pueblo Bonito began around 920, but it is now known that building at the great house started almost one hundred years earlier, c. 850.
