= Kin Nahasbas =

Archaeological site in New Mexico, United States

Kin Nahasbas is a Chacoan Anasazi great house and archaeological site located in Chaco Canyon, 25 miles southwest of Nageezi, New Mexico, United States. Built in either the 9th or 10th centuries, it was major pueblo located slightly north of the Una Vida complex, which is positioned at the foot of the north mesa. Limited excavation has been conducted in this area. The ruins are now protected within the borders of Chaco Culture National Historical Park.

== History ==
Archeologists Lekson, Windes and McKenna place the construction of Kin Nahasbas (kin nahas bas) in the late 9th century along with early construction work on Pueblo Bonito, Peñasco Blanco, Una Vida, the Padilla Well Great House, the East Community, Pueblo Pintado and Casa del Rio at the extreme western end of the Chaco core.

Unlike Pueblo Bonito, Una Vida and some of the other Great House ruins that can be seen in the Chaco park today, Nahasbas probably was not occupied or maintained into the next century. The late 9th century when Kin Nahasbas was built is the transition period between Pueblo I and II cultures. In Chaco the population of people living in small houses grew enormously. This growth was probably supported by migrating peoples drawn to Chaco from the great Pueblo I communities in the northern San Juan River region. The period provided favorable rains for farming maize in Chaco canyon and on the mesas that could sustain a growing "urban" Chaco population.

== Current status ==
Today the National Park Service does not have the Nahasbas House site open to visitors. It has not been excavated and stabilized and there are no interesting ruins to see.

Coordinates: 36°02′12″N 107°54′48″W
