= Chacra Face Road =

The Chacra Face Road is one of eight Ancestral Puebloan roads that enters Chaco Canyon, New Mexico. It enters the canyon through a break in the Chacra Mesa called the Fajada Gap, and ends at the great house Una Vida. It probably connected Una Vida to an eastern Puebloan community, Guadalupe Outlier.
