= Coyote Canyon Road =

Coyote Canyon Road is an Ancestral Puebloan road that leads from South Gap in the Chaco Culture National Historical Park to the southwest region of the San Juan Basin. The road is believed to lead to the Grey Ridge community north of Gallup, New Mexico, but only segments of it have been identified. A segment of the road was discovered between the great houses Kin Klizhin and Kin Bineola.

== Bibliography ==
- Vivian, R. Gwinn; Hilpert, Bruce (2012), The Chaco Handbook: An Encyclopedic Guide (2 ed.), University of Utah Press, ISBN 978-1-60781-195-4
