= Una Vida =

Archaeological site in New Mexico, US

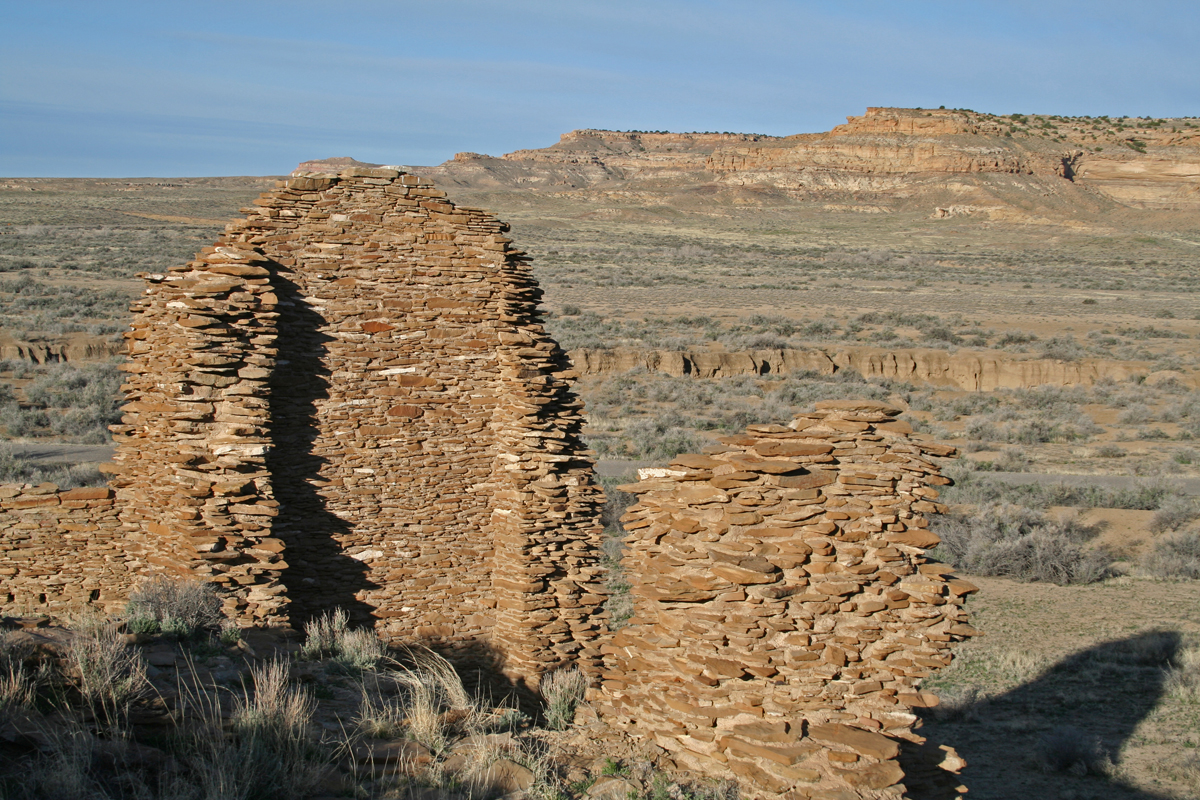

- Location within New Mexico today
- 36°2′1.32″N 107°54′44.64″W
- Cultures: Chacoan civilization
- Location: San Juan County, New Mexico, USA
- Region: San Juan County, New Mexico

History
- Built: 900

Una Vida is an archaeological site located in Chaco Canyon, San Juan County, New Mexico, United States. According to tree rings surrounding the site, its construction began around 800 AD, at the same time as Pueblo Bonito, and it is one of the three earliest Chacoan Ancestral Puebloan great houses. Comprising at least two stories and 160 rooms, it shares an arc or D-shaped design with its contemporaries, Peñasco Blanco and Pueblo Bonito, but has a unique "dog leg" addition made necessary by topography. It is located in one of the canyon's major side drainages, near Gallo Wash, and was massively expanded after 930 AD.

The site is surrounded by rock art and petroglyphs that depict human figures, solar signs, and geometric forms. It was first recorded in the mid-19th century by US military that were surveying the area of modern New Mexico. The site was acquired after the war with Mexico and was only partly excavated in the 1950s and 1960s.

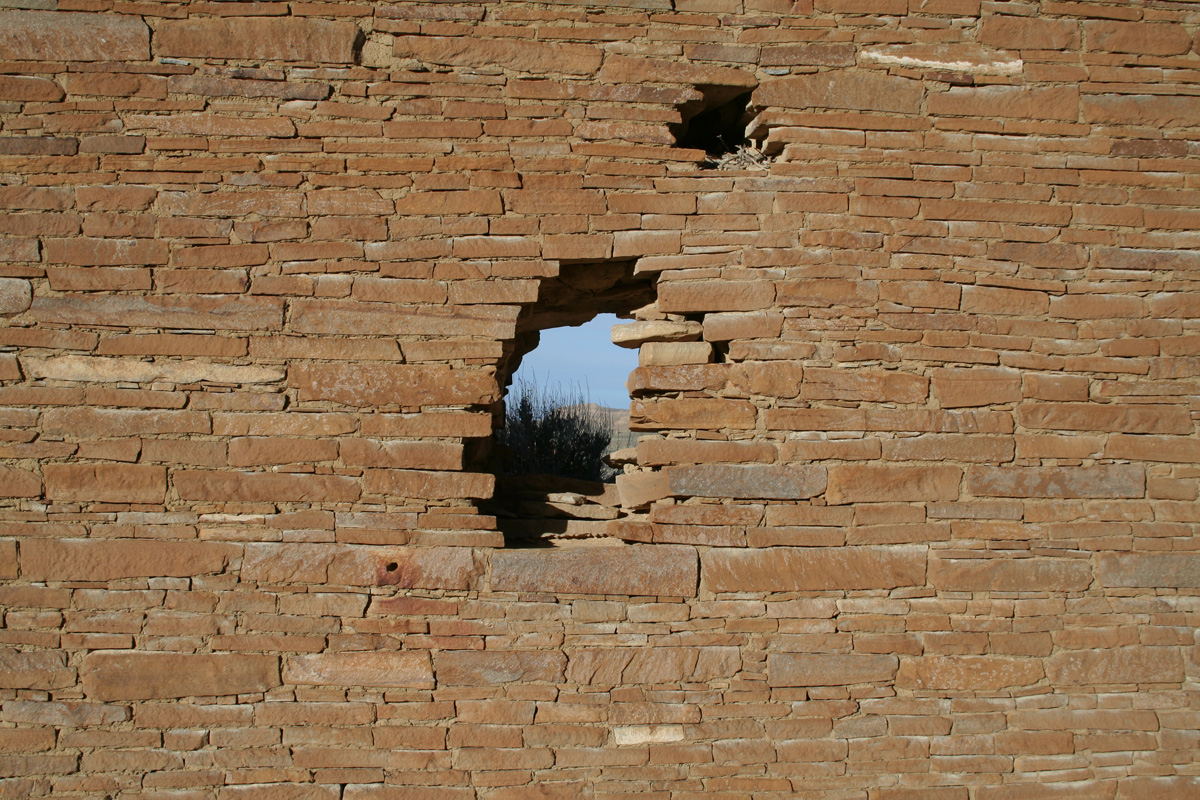
Masonry detail at Una Vida Pueblo, Chaco Canyon, New Mexico.

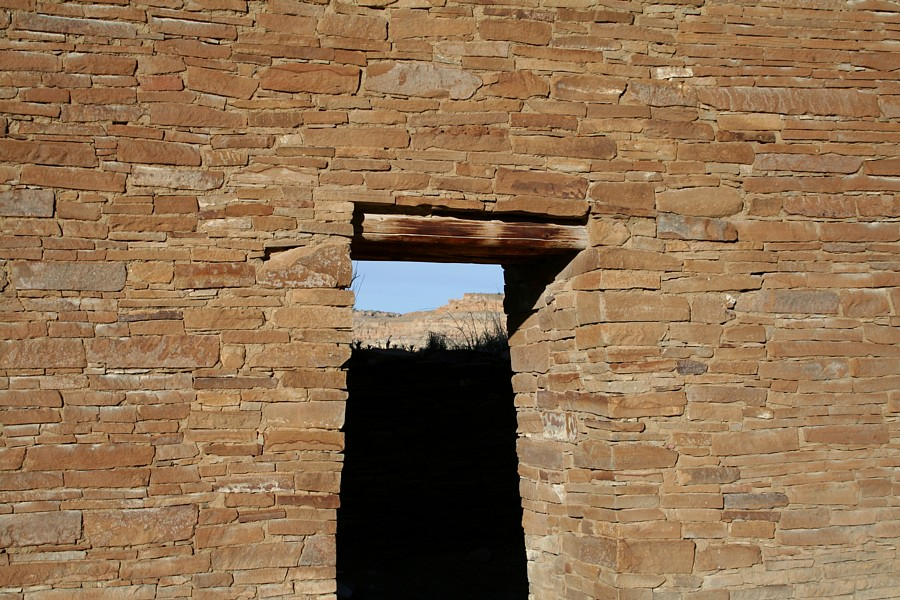
Una Vida Pueblo doorway in Chaco Canyon, New Mexico.

== Etymology ==
Una Vida means "One Life" in the Spanish language.

== Chaco Road ==
Chaco Road is a network of roads (for travel and trade) which radiated from great house sites, such as Pueblo Bonito, Chetro Ketl and Una Vida, leading to small house sites on the periphery of Chaco Canyon. Una Vida today is in a near-natural state of preservation, with minor excavations. A one-mile roundtrip trail is now in place so that tourists can come and explore the site as they please.
