= Kin Bineola =

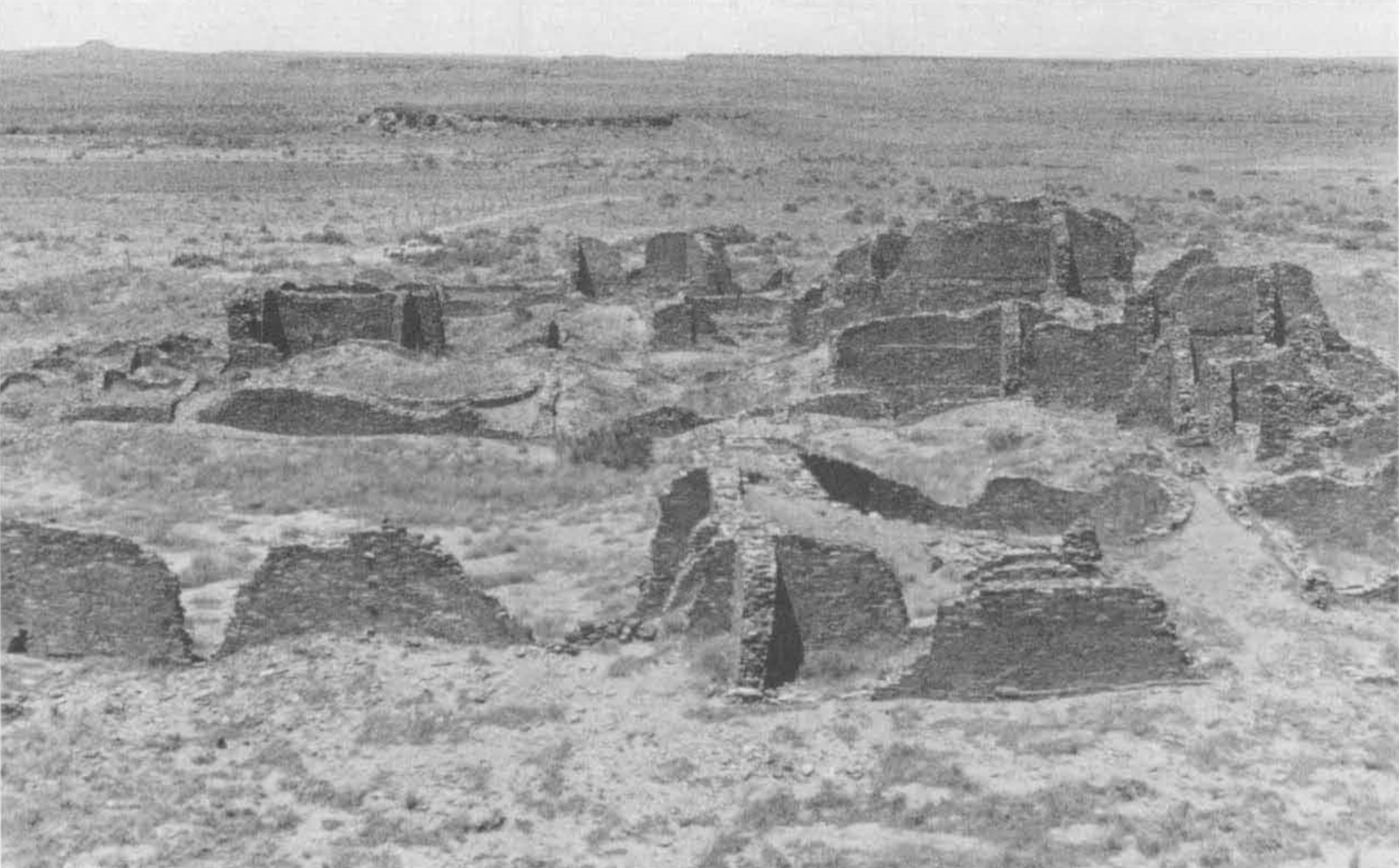
- Interactive map of Kin Bineola
- 36.003286°N 108.140807°W
- Location: Chaco Culture National Historical Park, New Mexico, United States
- Nearest city: Gallup, New Mexico

History
- Built: 1080–1100

Site notes
- Architectural style: Ancestral Puebloan
- Governing body: National Park Service

Kin Bineola is an Ancestral Puebloan great house and archeological site located 12 miles (19 km) from Pueblo Bonito in Chaco Culture National Historical Park, New Mexico, United States. Construction on the core of the building, which is E-shaped, began in the early 10th century; it was significantly remodeled and enlarged during the 12th century. At its peak Kin Bineola contained nearly 200 rooms and 10 kivas, with an associated great kiva nearby. Irrigation canals have been uncovered at the site, which lies north of Kin Bineola Wash, where several small house sites have been found.
