= Mexican Springs Road =

Mexican Springs Road is an Ancestral Puebloan road that parallels Coyote Canyon Road. It runs from South Gap in Chaco Canyon to the southwestern portion of the San Juan Basin. It has only been identified through aerial photography, and no physical trace of it is visible from the ground. The lack of pueblos along its path has led some to question its designation as a Chacoan road.
