= Guadalupe Outlier =

Ancestral Puebloan site in New Mexico, USA

Coordinates: 35°31′05″N 107°07′35″W

Guadalupe Outlier Chacoan Outlier
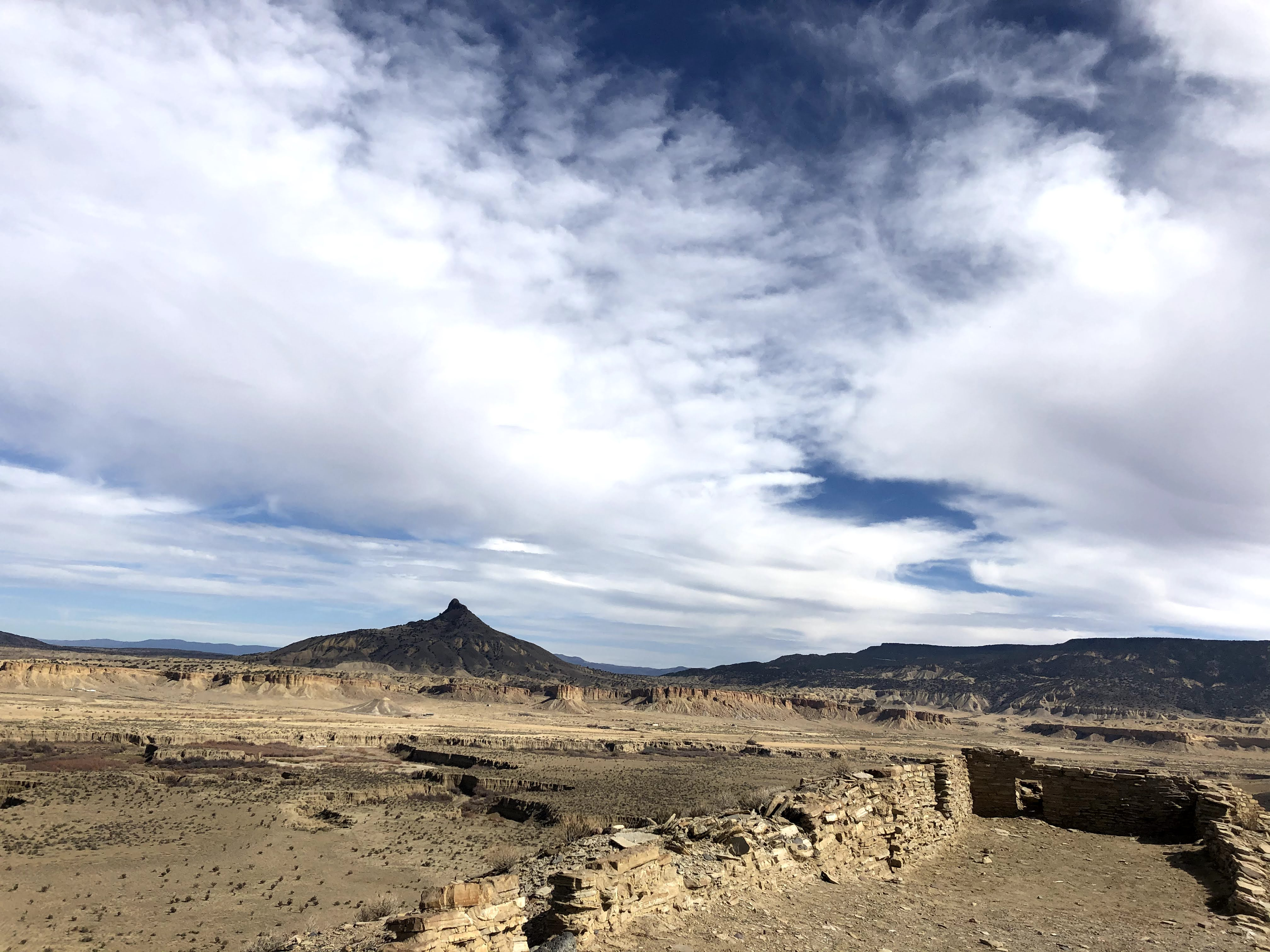
- Interactive map of Guadalupe Outlier; Chacoan Outlier
- Type: Ancient Puebloan
- Location: Sandoval County, New Mexico, USA

History
- Built: prior to 920 AD

Guadalupe Outlier is an Ancestral Puebloan site in Chaco Culture National Historical Park in New Mexico, United States. The site is described by author Stephen H. Lekson as "sitting atop the second-most spectacular setting of any outlier, a narrow high mesa overlooking the Rio Puerco (Rio Grande tributary), about 100 kilometres (62 mi) from Chaco". Guadalupe Outlier is the easternmost of the Chacoan ruins and was occupied from roughly 920 to 1130 AD. By the late thirteenth century it had been "remodeled and occupied by a Mesa Verde population". The site was excavated by Lonnie C. Pippin between 1972 and 1975 as part of Eastern New Mexico University's Rio Puerco Valley Archaeological Project. The evidence from Guadalupe Ruin reveals some of these Chaco outliers were established only shortly after the initial development of the Great Pueblos in Chaco Canyon. Throughout their histories, these Chaco outliers were closely related to organized developments in Chaco Canyon and were tied to the Great Houses in the canyon by a network of roads. Nevertheless, despite the architectural similarities and networks of communication between Chaco outliers and the Great Pueblos in Chaco Canyon, the occupants of outlying Chaco towns such as Guadalupe Ruin had a material culture like that of the regionally differentiated village populations.

== Gallery ==
Chacoan Outlier: "Guadalupe Outlier".

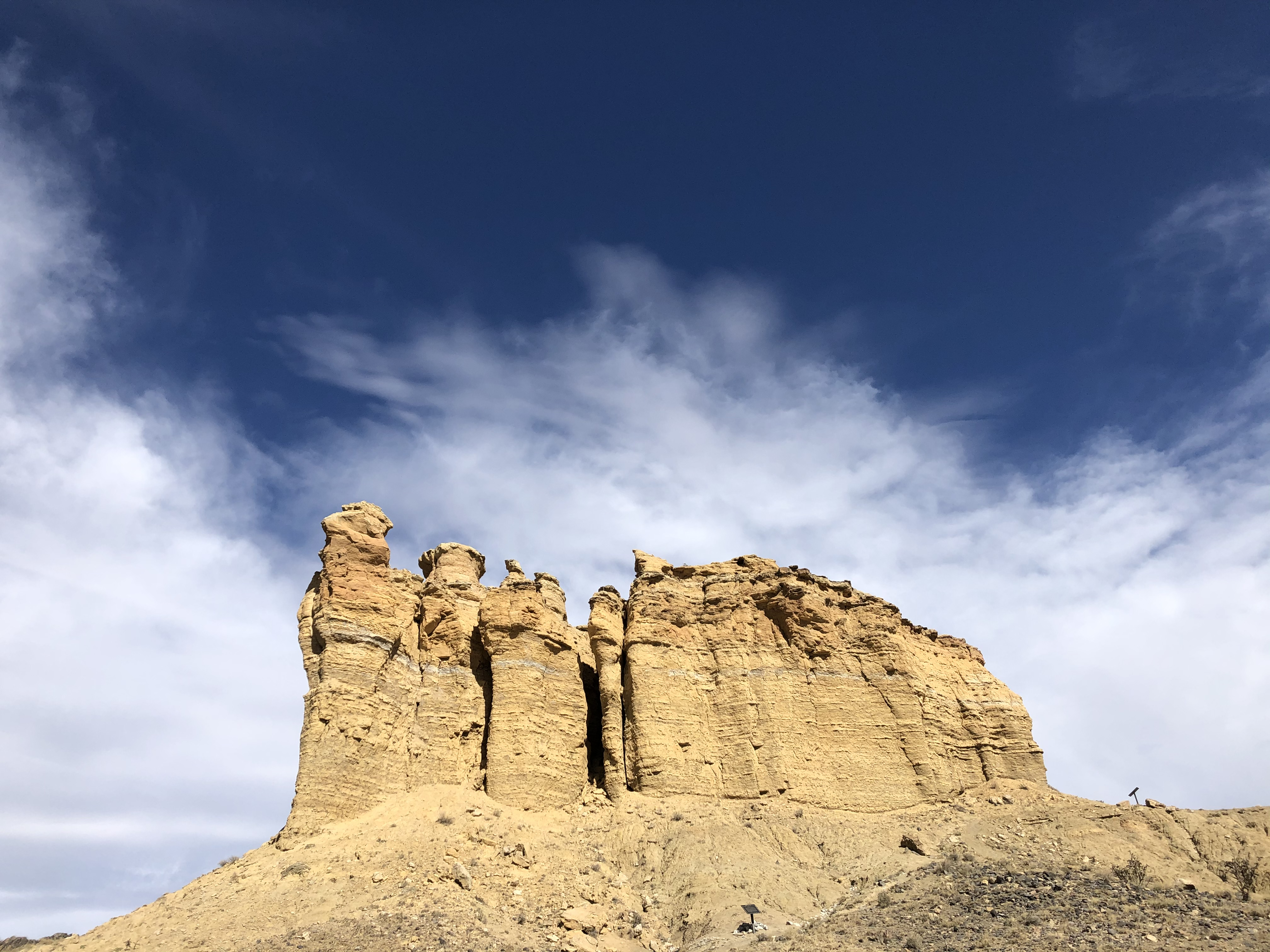

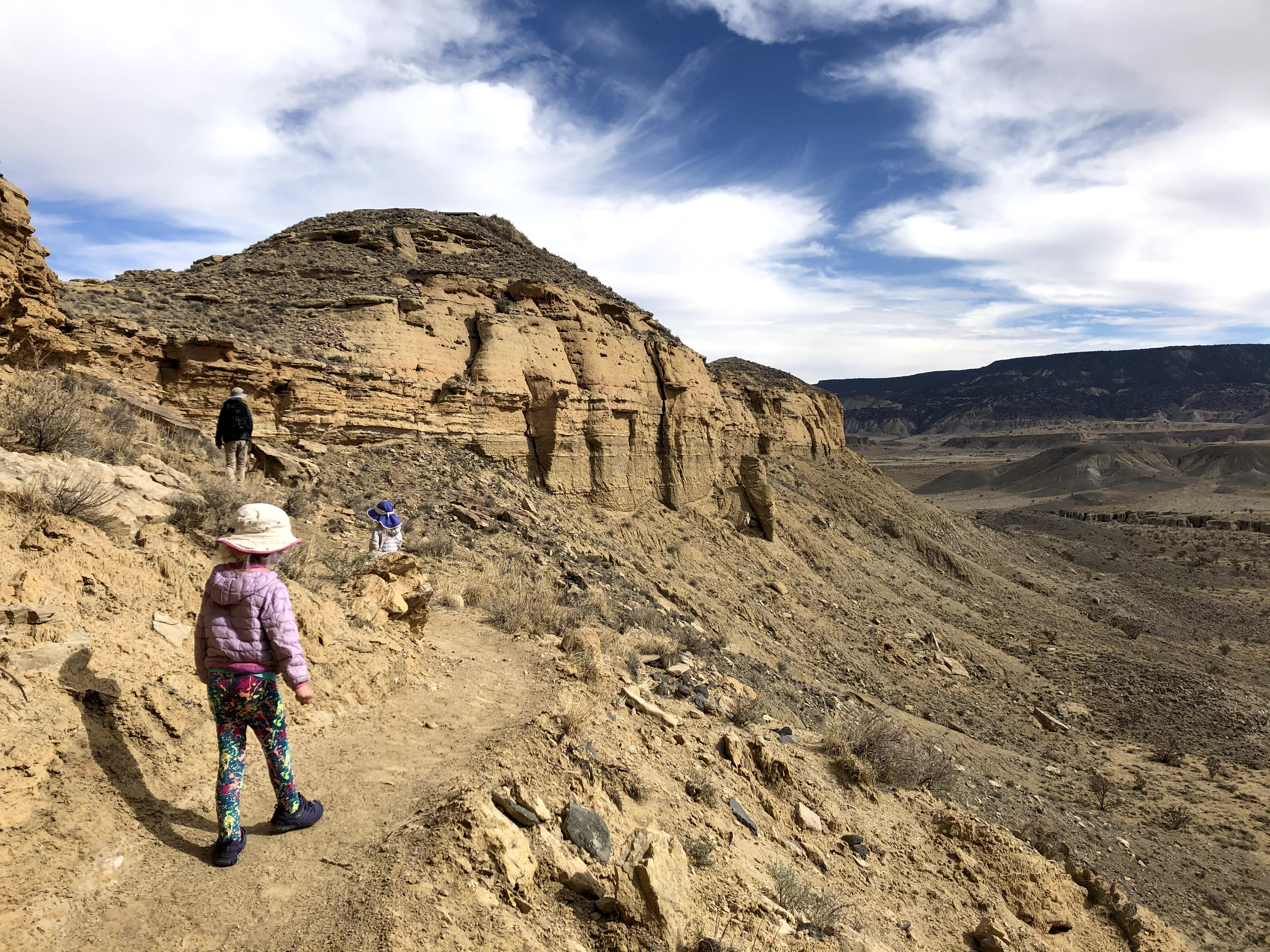

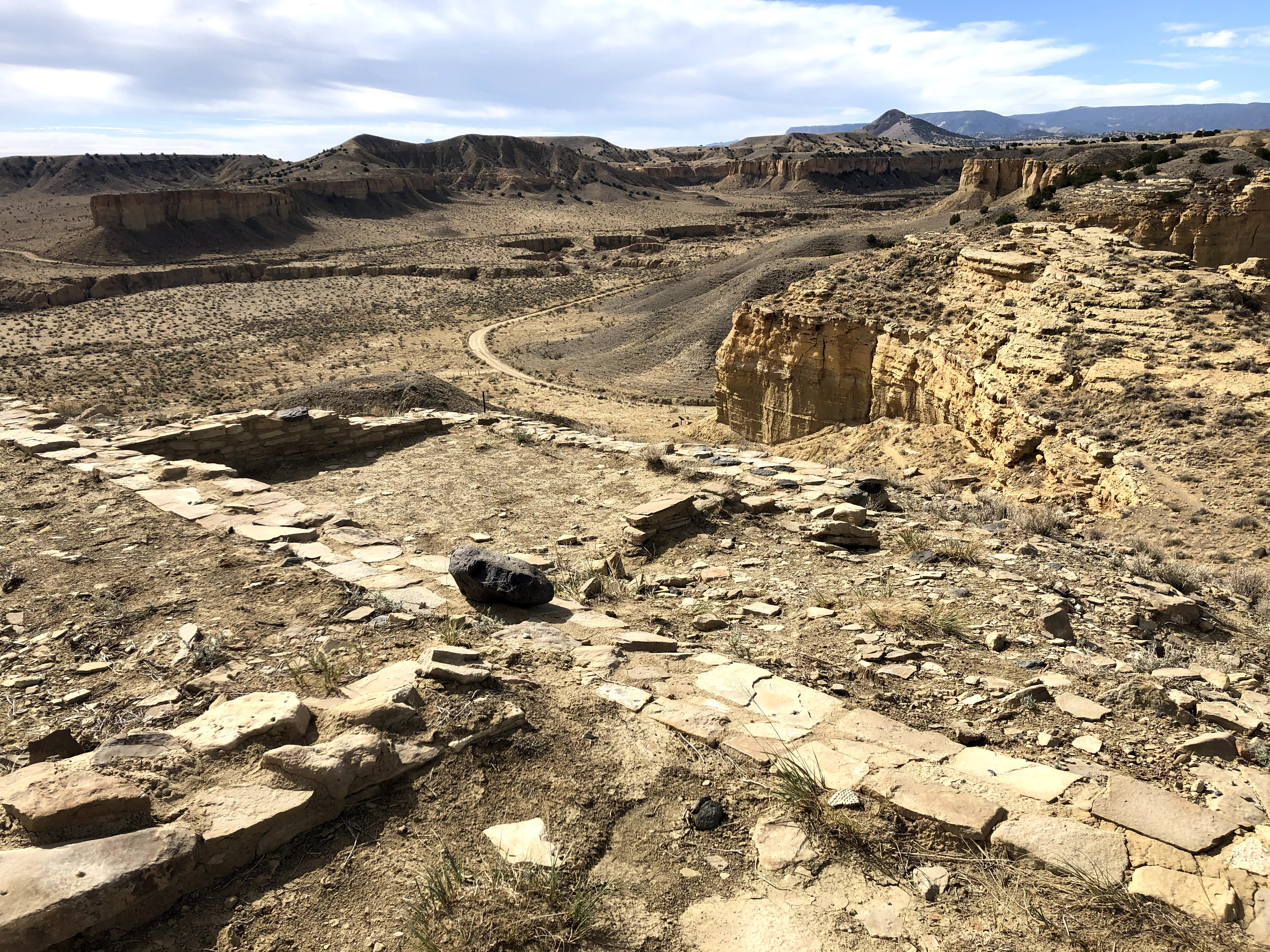

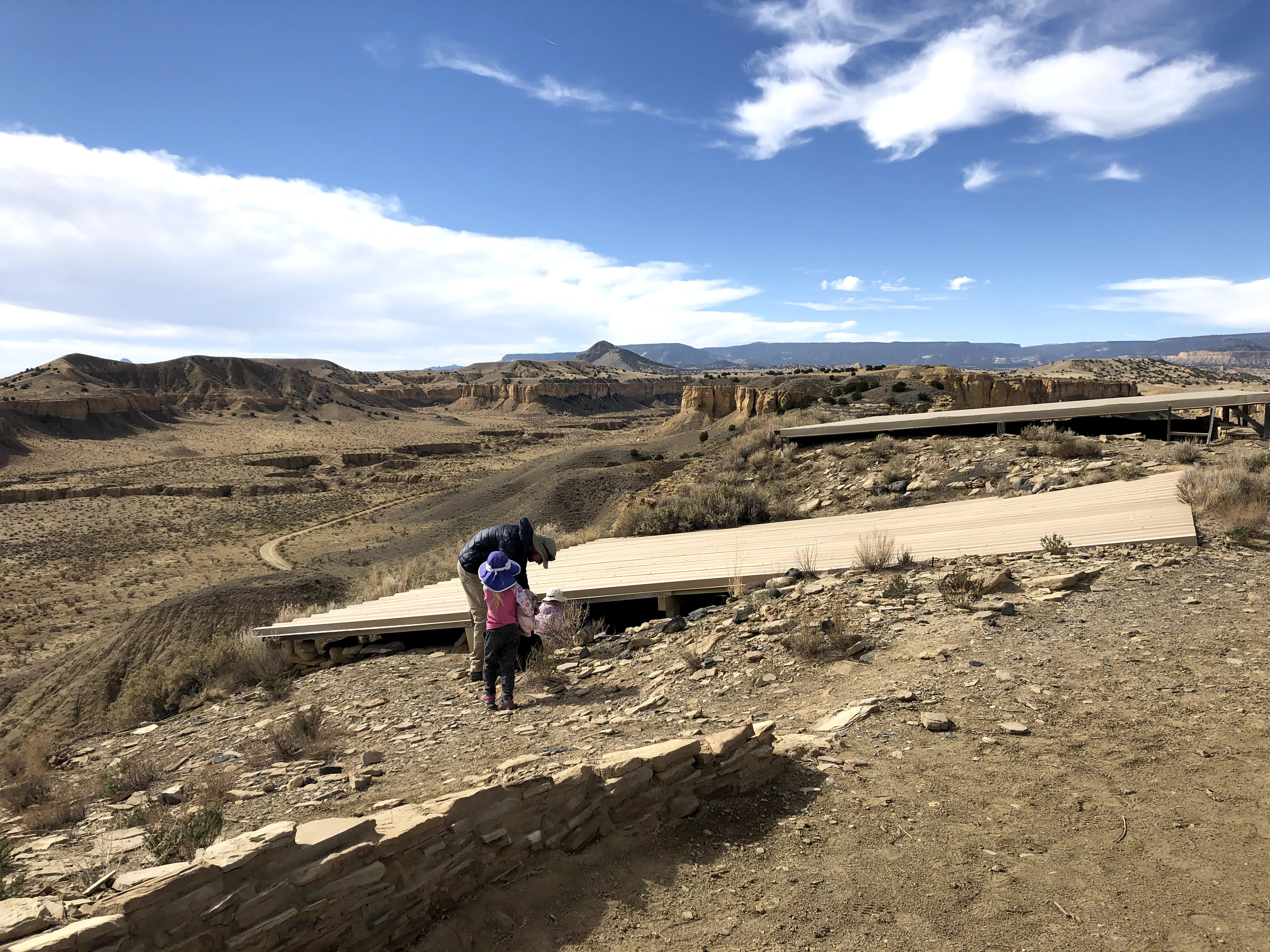

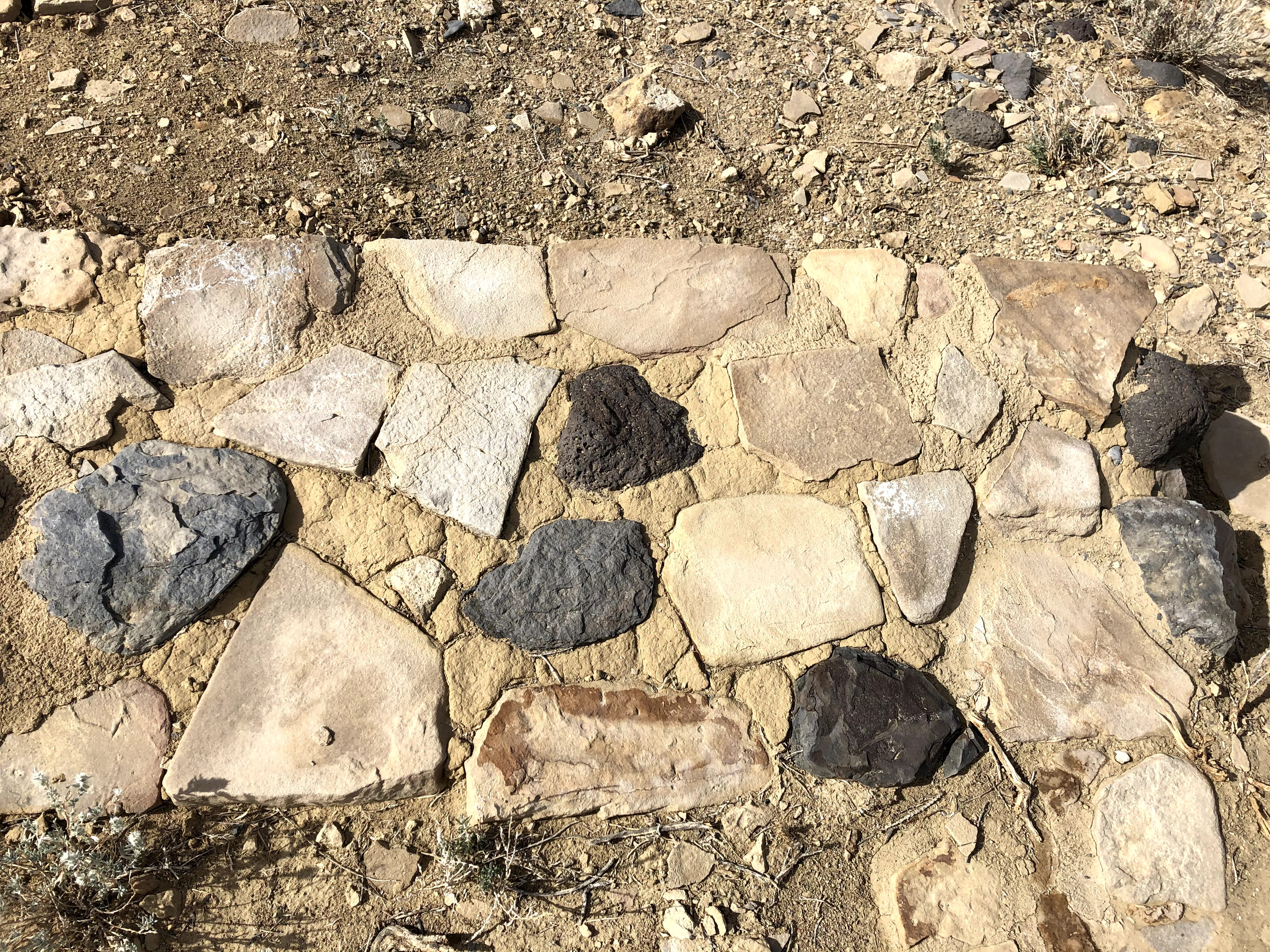
Stone wall of pueblo

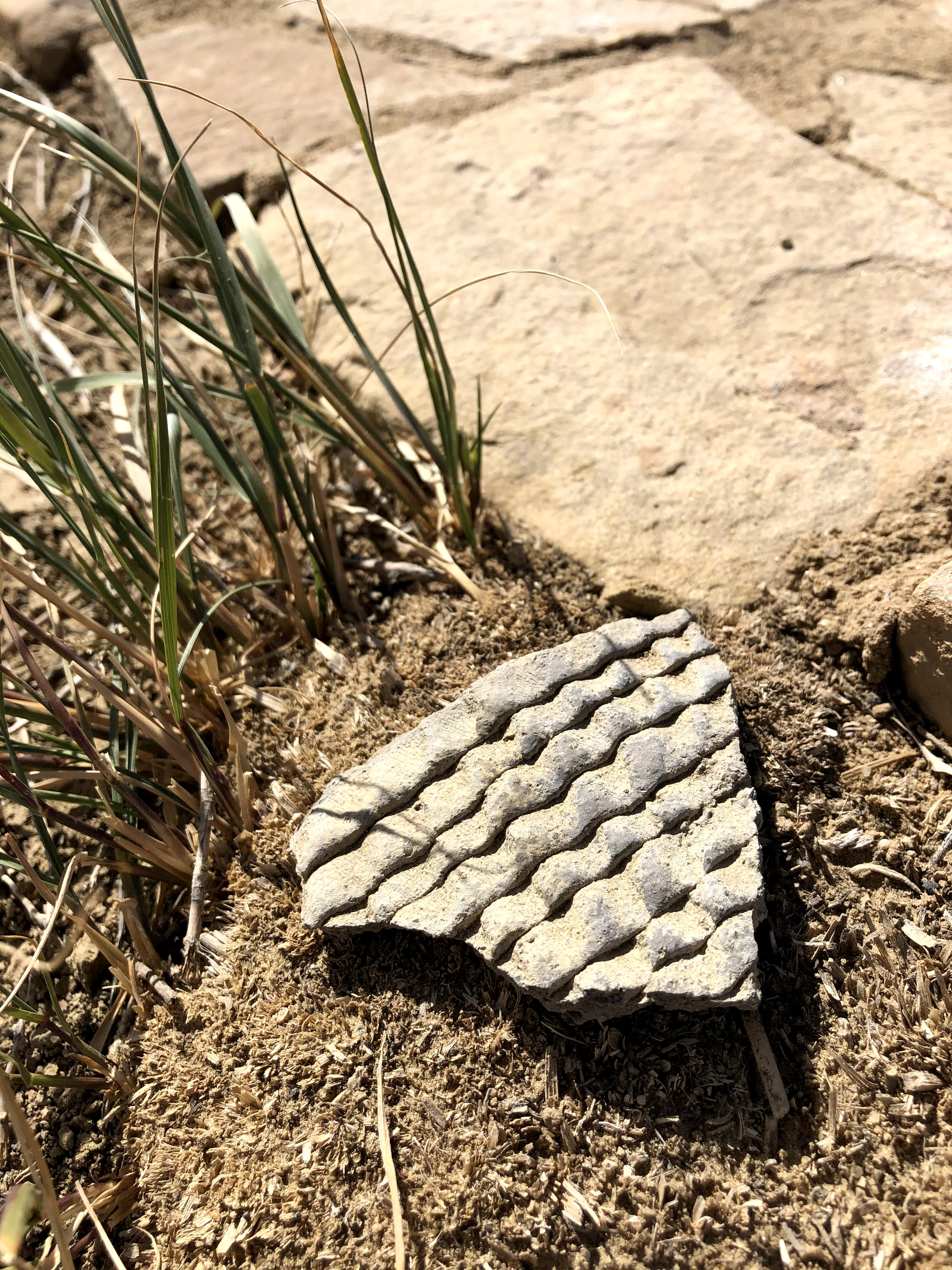
Corrugated type pottery shard in the Ancestral Puebloan tradition

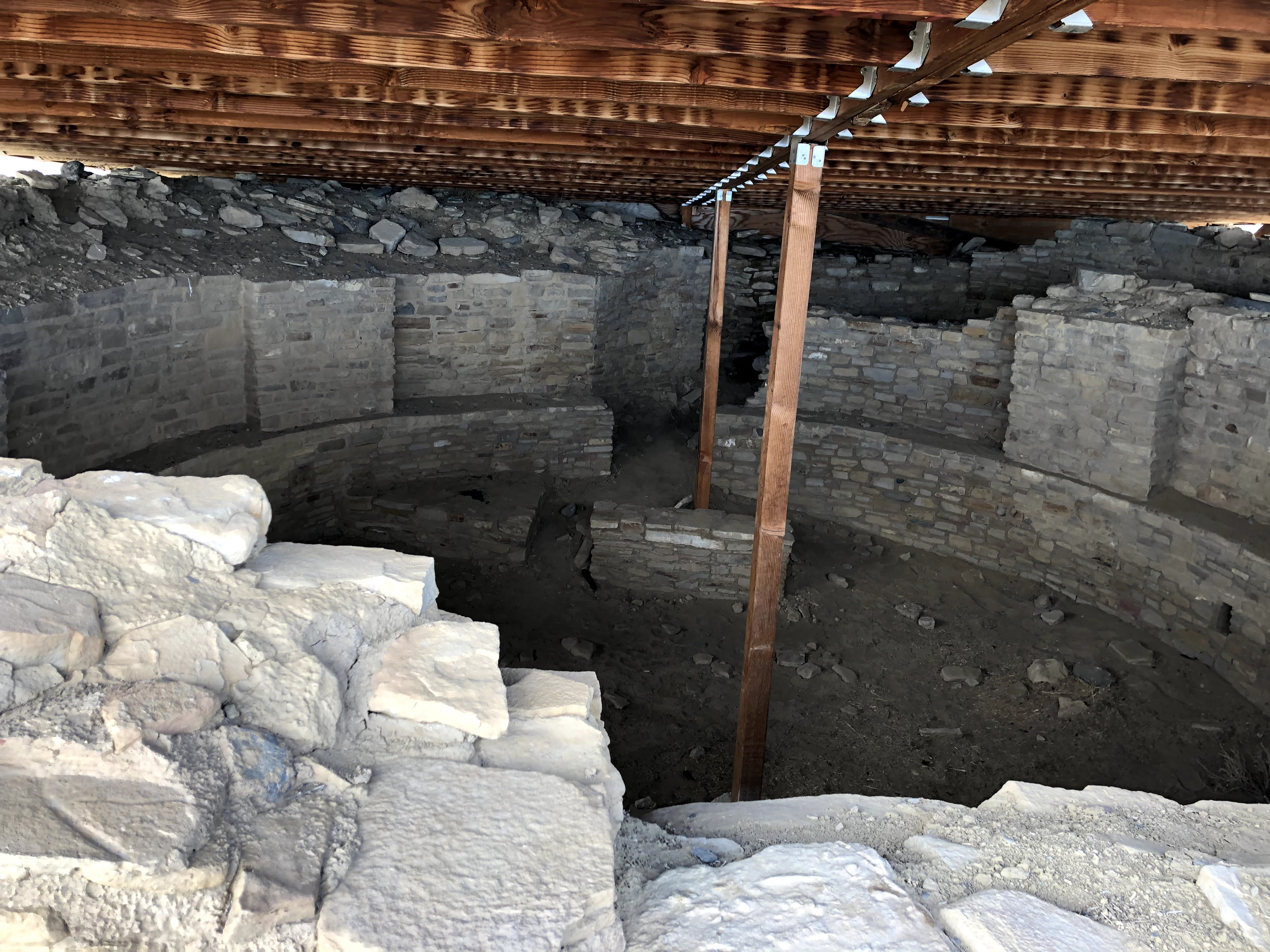
View into the ceremonial kiva
