= Pueblo Alto =

Archaeological site in New Mexico, US

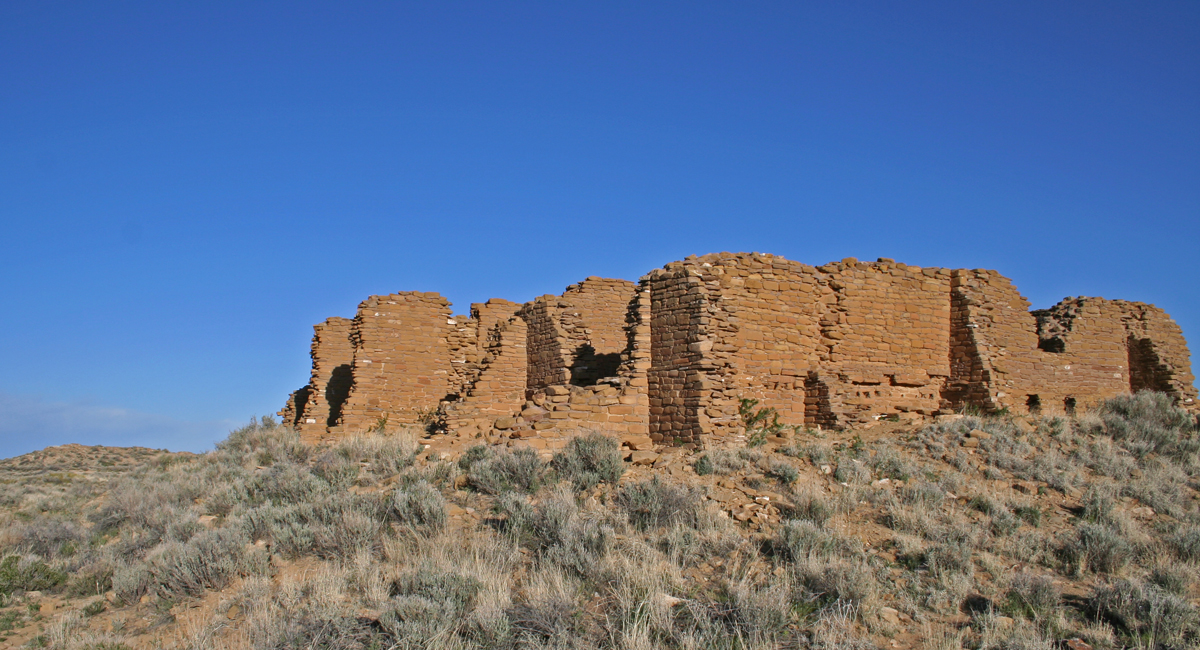
Nuevo Alto Pueblo and Pueblo Alto are located on the mesa north of Chaco Canyon.

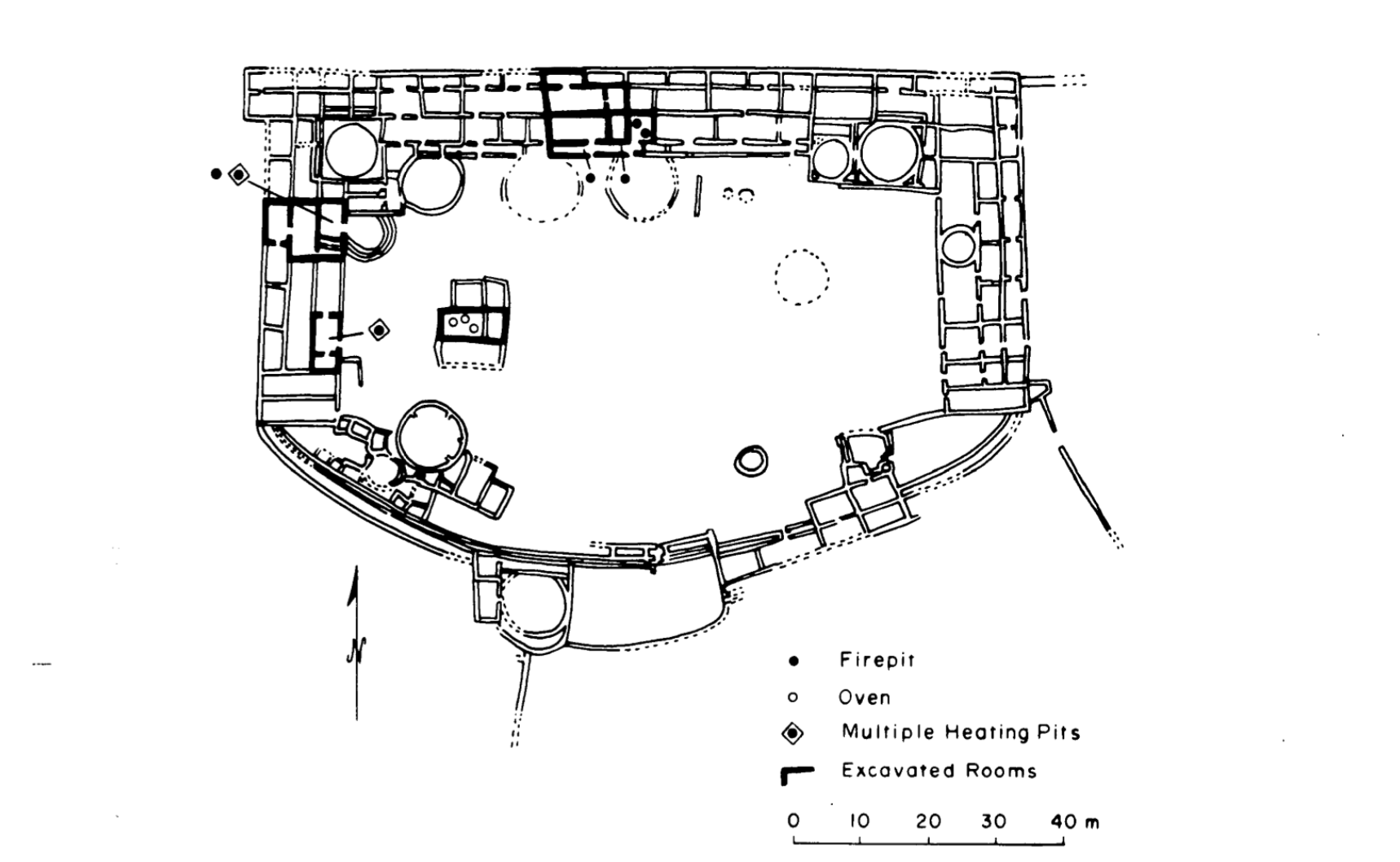
A site map of Pueblo Alto

Pueblo Alto ("High Village" in Spanish), or Old Alto, is an Ancestral Puebloan great house and archaeological site located in Chaco Culture National Historical Park in northwestern New Mexico in the United States.

== Location ==
Pueblo Alto is located at the top of a mesa near the middle of Chaco Canyon, 0.6 miles (0.97 km) from Pueblo Bonito. Its location made the community visible to most of the inhabitants of the San Juan Basin; indeed, it was only 2.3 miles (3.7 km) north of Tsin Kletsin, on the opposite side of the canyon.

== Description ==
Begun between AD 1020 and 1050, the complex comprises 133 masonry rooms and 18 kivas in a single-story layout. Storerooms at Pueblo Alto opened to the outside rather than into the interior rooms.

Pueblo Alto shares its mesa with another great house, Nuevo Alto, both of which are now protected within the borders of Chaco Culture National Historical Park.

The site was partially excavated from 1976 to 1978.

== Usage ==
Research suggests that as few as five to twenty families lived in the complex; this may imply that Pueblo Alto served a primarily non-residential role. The community was the center of a bead- and turquoise-processing industry that influenced the development of all villages in the canyon. Chert tool production was also common. There was a huge midden containing pottery and chert, most of which came from the Chuska area 70 km (43 mi) to the west.

A refuse mound is located 150 feet southeast of the site. A lot of imported ceramics, deliberately broken and deposited, was found in the mound, leading to theories that the mound was a platform for frequent rituals.

Coordinates: 36.0698°N 107.9574°W
