= Peñasco Blanco =

Ruined Chacoan Great House

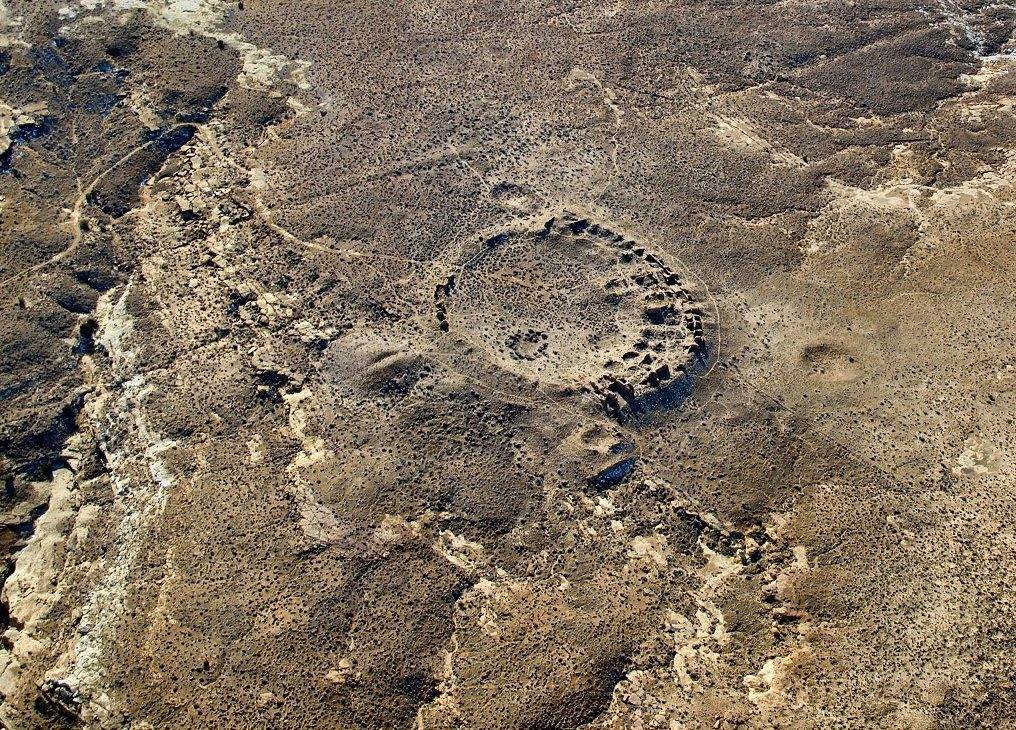
- Peñasco Blanco, a Chacoan Great House

- Location within New Mexico today
- Interactive map of Peñasco Blanco
- 36°04′53″N 108°00′11″W
- Cultures: Chacoan civilization
- Location: San Juan County, New Mexico, US
- Region: San Juan County, New Mexico

History
- Built: 900
- Abandoned: 1125

Peñasco Blanco ("White Bluff" in Spanish) is a Chacoan Ancestral Puebloan great house and notable archaeological site located in Chaco Canyon, a canyon in San Juan County, New Mexico, United States. The pueblo consists of an arc-shaped room block, part of an oval enclosing a plaza and great kiva, along with two great kivas outside the great house. The pueblo was built atop the canyon's southern rim to the northwest of the great houses in the main section of the canyon.

The building was constructed in five distinct stages between AD 900 and 1125, during the Pueblo III Period. A cliff painting (the "Supernova Pictograph") nearby may record the sighting of a supernova on July 5, 1054 AD.^{[α]}

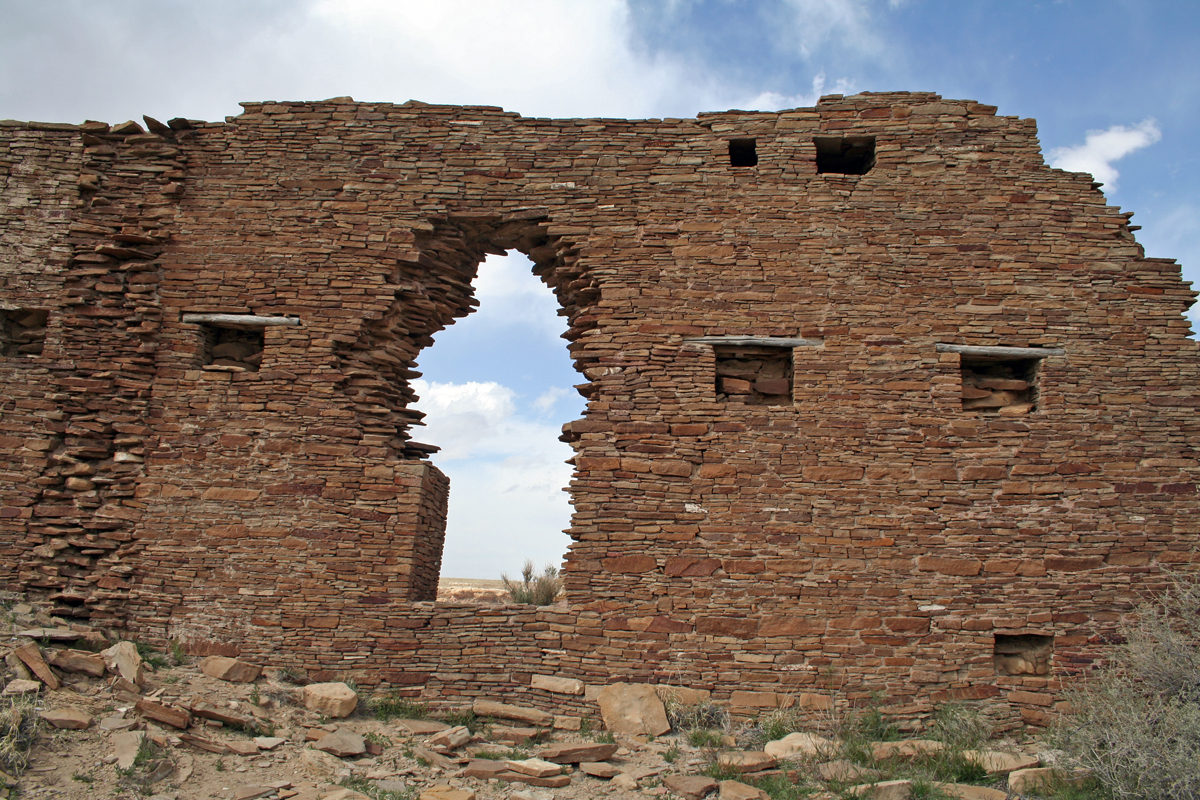
Peñasco Blanco Pueblo wall.

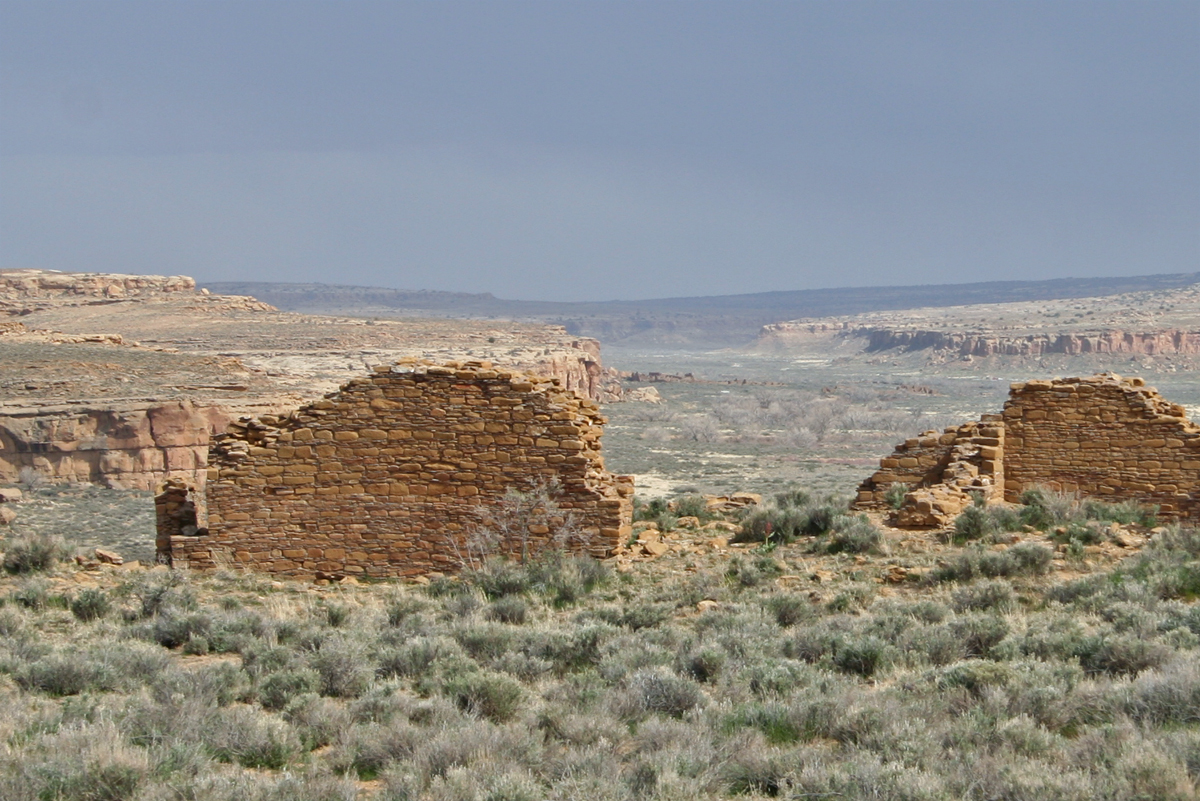
Peñasco Blanco view of Chaco Canyon.

== Notes ==
α. The Crab Nebula, now a supernova remnant in the constellation of Taurus, was the result of the event in question; it attained peak brilliance on the date that the Chacoans presumably sighted it.
