= Kin Klizhin =

Archeological house in New Mexico

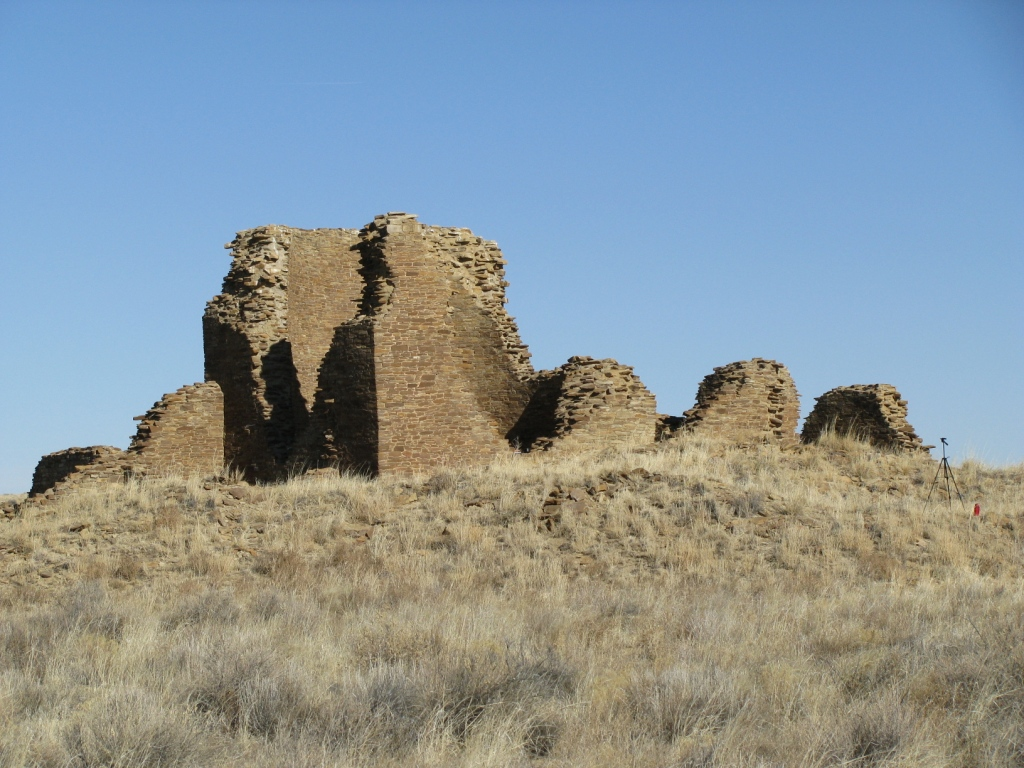
Kin Klitzin

Kin Klizhin is a small house in the Chaco Canyon, approximately 16.1 kilometres (10.0 mi) southwest of Pueblo Bonito, New Mexico, United States. It dates to the 1080s. It consists of "16 rooms, two kivas, a tower kiva, and an enclosed plaza". The Kin Klizhin Wash flows in the vicinity, which was used to provide irrigation to nearby fields. The site remains unexcavated.

Coordinates: 36.0288°N 108.0730°W
