= Great house (pueblo) =

Multi-storied Ancestral Puebloan structure

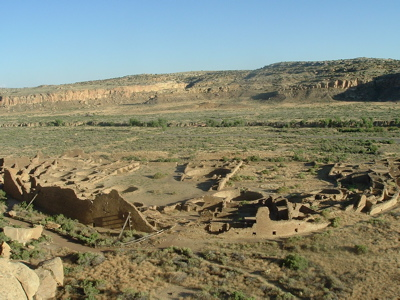
Pueblo Bonito, in Chaco Canyon

A great house is a large, multi-storied Ancestral Puebloan structure; they were built between 850 and 1150. Whereas the term "great house" typically refers to structures in Chaco Canyon, they are also found in more northerly locations in the San Juan Basin, including the Mesa Verde region. The purpose of the structures is unclear, but may have been to house large numbers of people, religious leaders, or royalty. They were designed and constructed to provide shelter to inhabitants in an arid climate and had protective walls and small windows.

== History and purpose ==
Great house construction flourished during the late 11th and early 12th centuries, and may have begun as early as 800. Mesa Verdeans usually built their great houses on the site of older villages. The earliest examples of structures similar to great houses have been found along the Mimbres River in New Mexico.

Archeologists differ as to their purpose, but they might have been residences for large numbers of people, or ceremonial centers that only priests occupied. Archeologist Stephen H. Lekson has proposed that they might have been the palaces of Puebloan royalty, particularly those found at Chaco Canyon. Additionally, Chaco Canyon area was a regional trading center and approximately half of the total area of the structures were storage rooms.

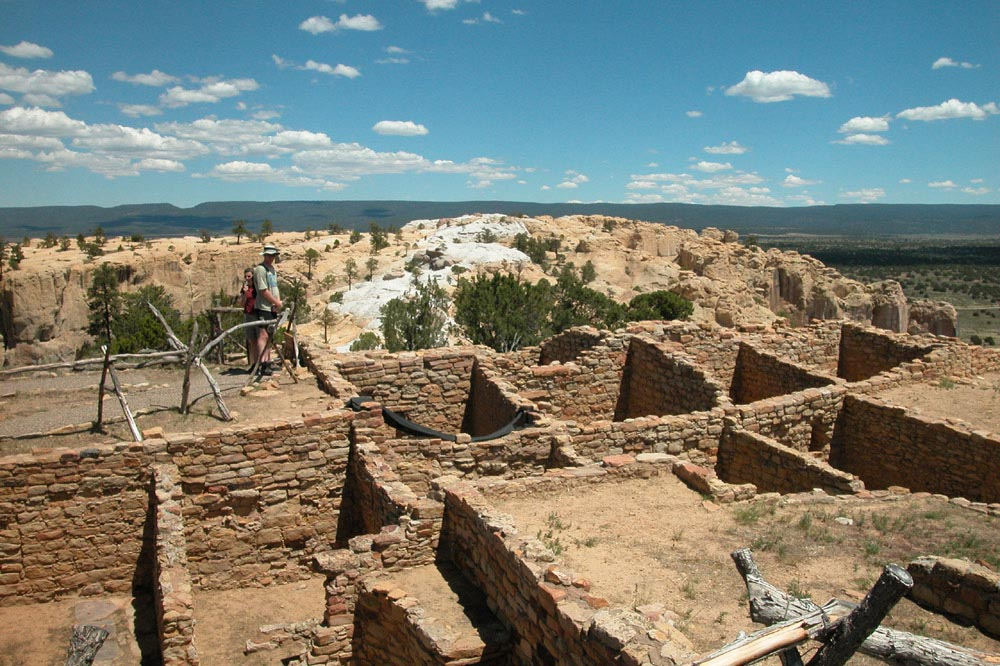
Ruins of walls of ancient Pueblo structure from El Morro National Monument.

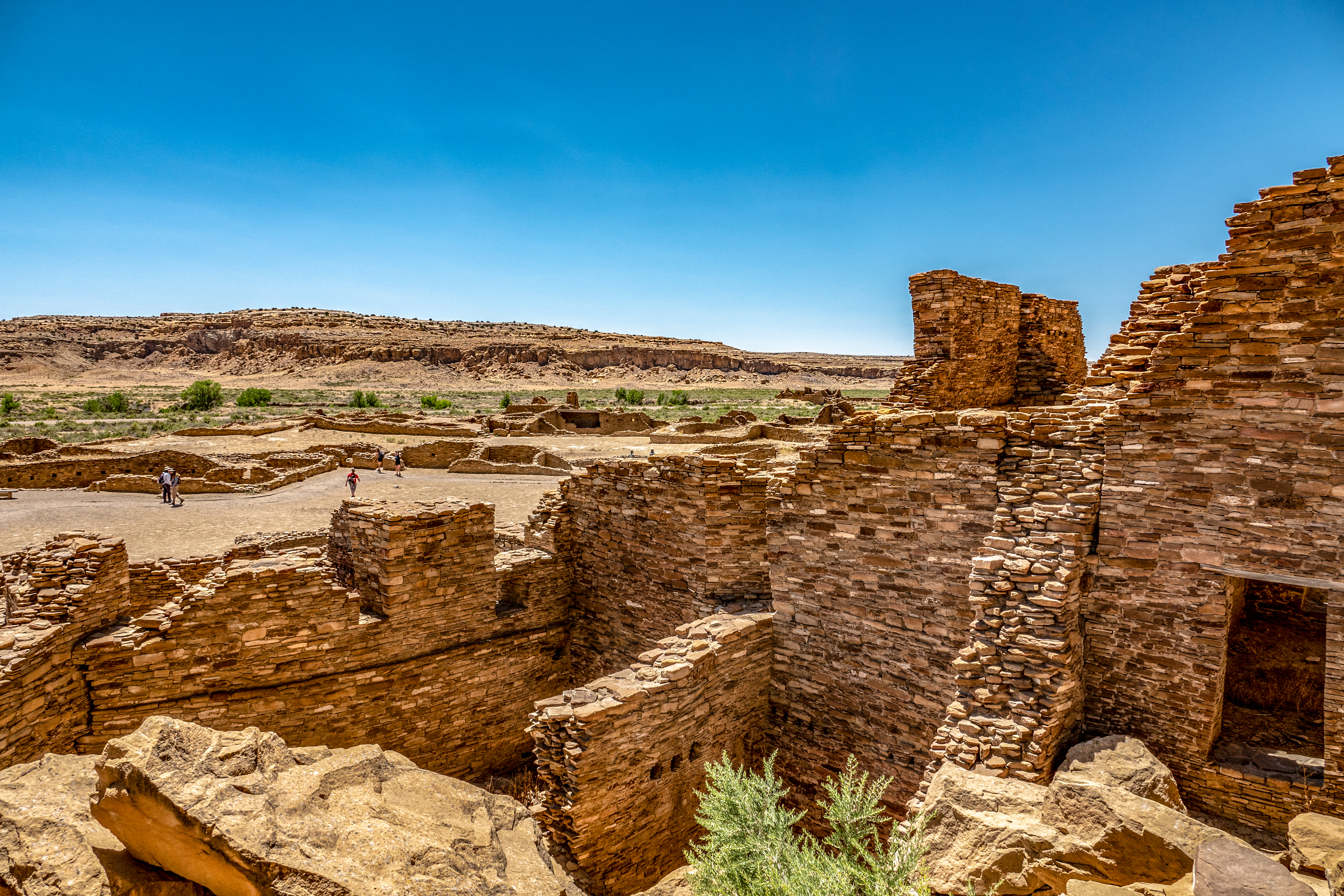
Pueblo Bonito, showing construction of walls.

== Design ==
Spaces were generally divided into four sections aligned with the cardinal directions, which held religious significance. The great houses at Pueblo Alto were aligned along a north–south axis. Entrances to structures were generally south or southeast facing. This provided shade from summer sun and warmth from winter sun. The back of the buildings were joined with a large wall to provide shelter from wind. At the center of the structure was a plaza, meant to serve as a community center. Great house complexes are also characterized by earthen berms and formal road segments.

Structures utilized thick walls, small entrances, and small windows to help protect inhabitants in an arid environment. Walls were constructed with stone and adobe plaster. Roofs were made from timber and have decayed faster than the walls that supported them.

== Influence ==
Mary Colter designed buildings in the Southwest, including Hopi House which was modeled after Puebloan great houses and built to provide shelter for visitors and a reference for scale. Hopi House was her first work in the Grand Canyon area, completed in 1904, and was constructed before the area was dedicated as a national park.
