= Roads of Chaco =

Prehistoric roads in Chaco Canyon, New Mexico

The Roads of Chaco stretch all over the Chaco Canyon, in New Mexico, United States. These roads have many theorized uses ranging from economic, military, and a total unification effort of the canyon as a whole.

== History ==
Attempting to date ancient roads always proves to be a difficult thing. Using mean ceramic dating, Chris Kincaid was able to gather a rough estimate of the ages of these few roads. This study placed the South Road around 900 A.D. and the North and Ahshislepah Roads around 1000 A.D. Later studies would use more advanced forms of dating to place most of the roads in the Chaco region from 1000 to 1100 A.D.

== Function ==
As it goes for most ancient roads, unless it has been specifically documented what the use of the road was, it can be very difficult to discern what its actual use was. For the case of the roads in the Chaco Canyon region these theories became of special interest because previous theories came to the conclusion that this region did not produce a complex social structure. The fact that there are roads lead researchers to believe that where there are roads there must be evidence of a more complex social system. Examining the roads and learning what they were used for would help to answer the question of what the greater Chaco area was like.

=== Economic ===
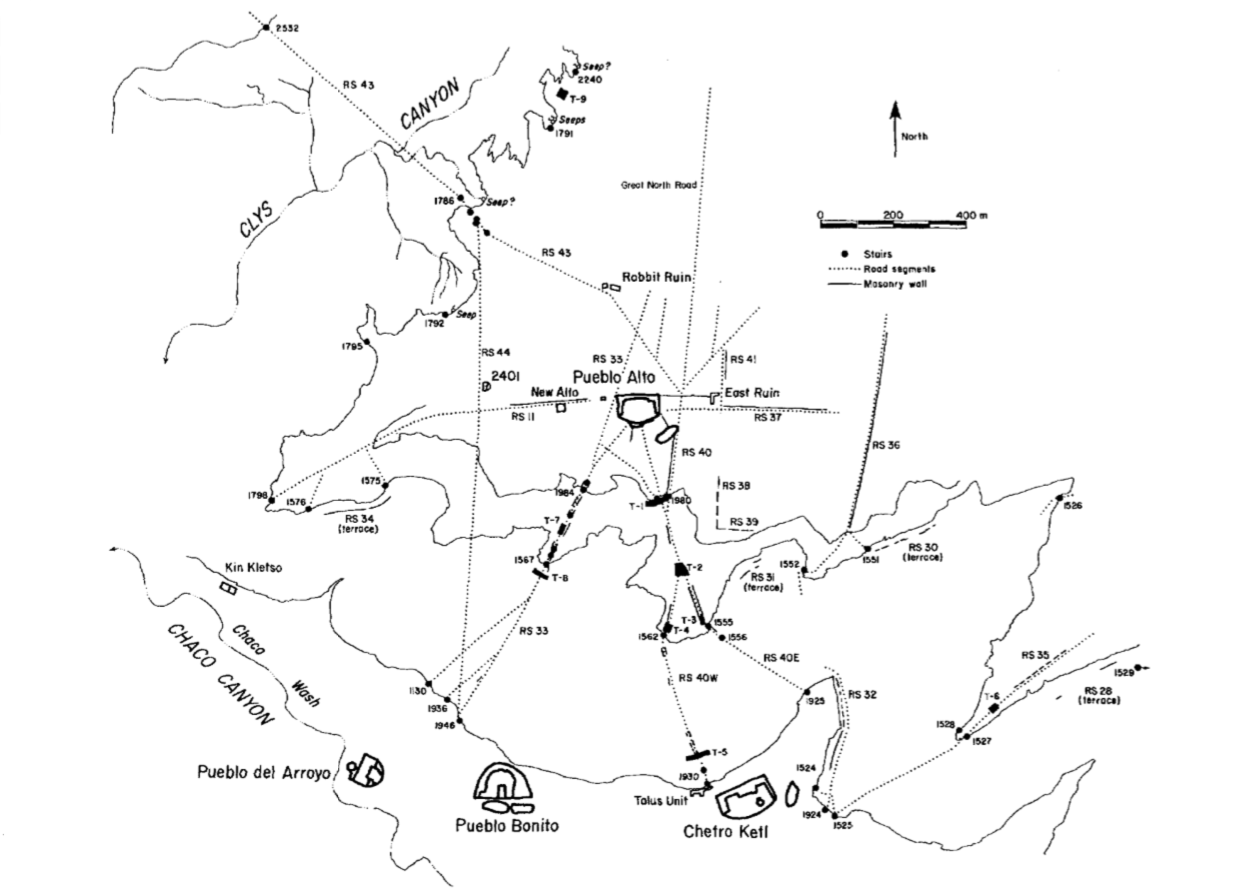
Map of roads in the Pueblo Alto region.

Potentially the most common use for roads, Ebert and Hitchcock proposed a central bureaucracy regulated agriculture around major urban centers. In more rural areas people could escape the reach of the government and manage their own farms. These farmers would need to transport their goods to and from the major urban centers, thus the miles of roads were constructed to accommodate the flow of goods in and out of each center.

Another use of the roads might serve to connect the main settlement with its satellite settlements in the surrounding area. These connecting roads would serve two purposes, easy travel between locations and transportation of goods. The main settlement would control the acquisition of farmed goods and manage distribution to its satellite settlements.

These central areas, or urban centers, would have been directly associated with the Great Houses, Penasco Blanco, Pueblo Alto, Pueblo del Arroyo, and Una Vida. These sites were located next to natural sites in the canyon and on vantage points. Some roads served to connect the Great Houses to each other but the bulk of the road system was broken down into four main roads. North, South, West, and Southwest were the main roads in the Powers' model of the Chaco road systems. These roads extended from Chaco Canyon out to locations with useful natural resources.

=== Military ===
Another proposed use of the roads in the Chaco region was for the military. A good infrastructure of roadways is invaluable for a quick military response. According to Wilcox, the great-house-based road network, used the ceremonial exchange of ritual turquoise to join the great house elites together. Eventually this association turned into a state demanding policy. These roads were used to advance the Chacoan military on their agriculturally rich neighbors, the great houses would be used as barracks or headquarters for local agents. The roads themselves offer some evidence to support this claim. The roads were built very wide allowing a large army to march side-by-side rather than single file. This permitted the military to reach their destinations much faster.

=== Unification ===
Another proposed function of the Chaco Canyon roads is unification. Vivian's paper outlines two unification models, symbolic and cosmographic. Symbolically the roads unify groups of settlements while cosmographically the roads signify the overall unification of the people as a whole and serves a more ritualistic purpose in the community.

==== Symbolic ====
The construction and use of these roads can be linked to the increasing number of droughts in the area. Migrating to more productive areas of the San Juan Basin, the main Chaco population abandoned the canyon to move to more hospitable lands. Constructing roads to link the populace together and counteract displacement was the main use of these roads.

==== Cosmographic ====
In several ancient cultures, the people would build road structures depicting constellations that they would see in the sky. Examples of this include the Inca Ceque systems and the Cuzco paths. The Cuzco paths are a cosmographical map the Inca incorporated into all things that align with their world view. In Chaco this theory is very similar, the roads serve as a map of the cosmos and the lines they make connect the stars on the ground.
