= Chacra Mesa =

Coordinates: 36.0089°N 107.8910°W

The Chacra Mesa is a high mesa massif composing the southwestern flank of Chaco Canyon, a region that is notable for its rich collection of Ancestral Puebloan archaeological sites.

It is located in the northwest portion of the U.S. state of New Mexico, in what is now Chaco Culture National Historical Park. The ruins of Tsin Kletsin, a Chacoan great house, sit on top of it.
