= Wijiji =

Archaeological site in New Mexico, US

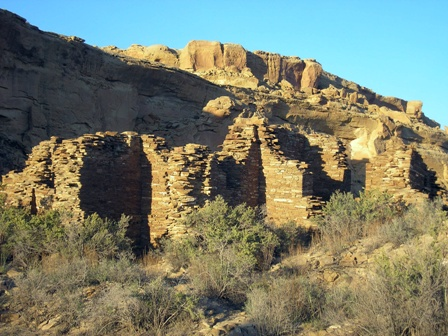
Wijiji great house

Wijiji is an Ancestral Puebloan great house and archaeological site located in Chaco Canyon, in New Mexico, United States.

== Overview ==
Comprising just over 100 rooms, Wijiji is the smallest of the Chacoan great houses. Built between AD 1110 and 1115, it was the last Chacoan great house to be constructed. Somewhat isolated within the narrow Chaco Wash, it is positioned 1 mile (1.6 km) from Una Vida.

== Etymology ==
Wijiji is a corrupted and garbled mispronunciation of Díwózhiishzhiin, meaning black greasewood in the Navajo language.

Coordinates: 36.0262°N 107.8693°W

== Bibliography ==
- Fagan, Brian (2005). Chaco Canyon: Archaeologists Explore the Lives of an Ancient Society. Oxford University Press. ISBN 978-0-19-517043-6.
