= Pueblo del Arroyo =

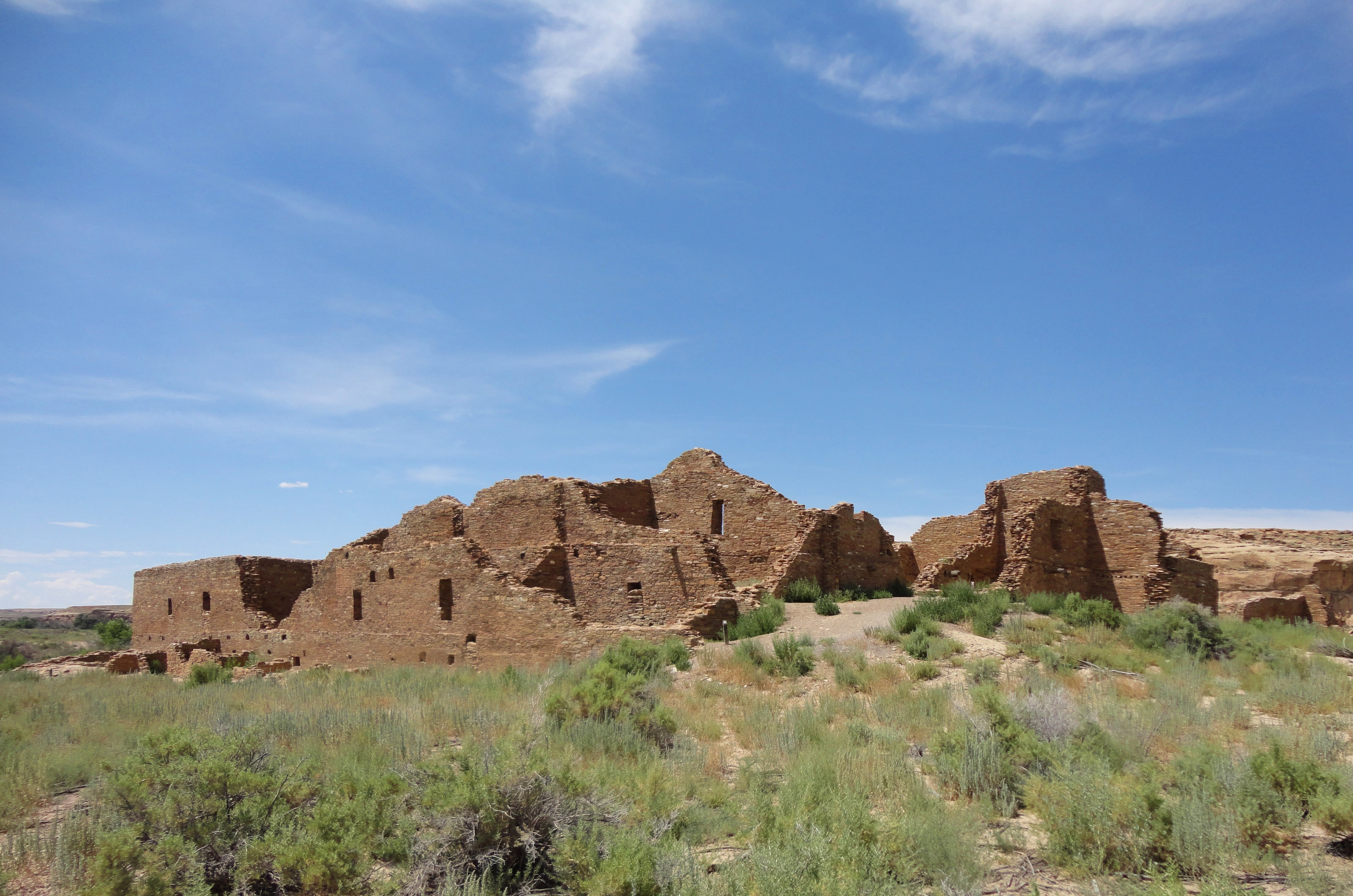
- Pueblo del Arroyo

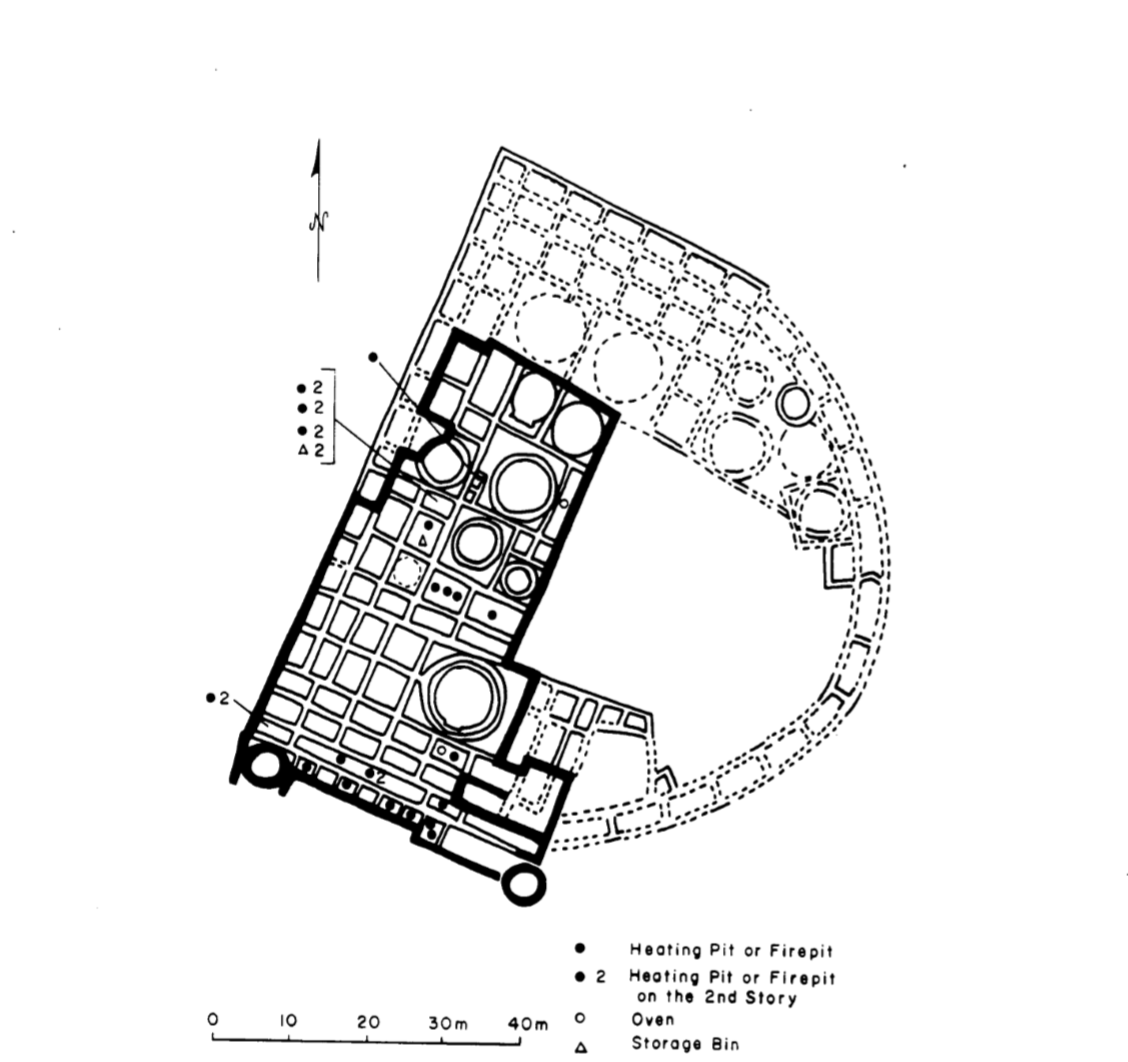
- Sitemap

Site notes
- Architectural style: Ancestral Puebloan
- Governing body: National Park Service

Pueblo del Arroyo is an Ancestral Puebloan great house and archaeological site located in Chaco Culture National Historical Park, in New Mexico, United States.

The construction of Pueblo del Arroyo, located a few hundred yards from Pueblo Bonito, near Chaco Wash, began c. 1060 AD and continued for approximately thirty years. With three hundred rooms, it is the fourth largest great house in Chaco Canyon. Whereas the other great houses in the canyon are located near the north wall and face south, Pueblo del Arroyo was built in the middle of the canyon facing east. The structure is located opposite South Gap.

American archaeologist Neil Judd excavated Pueblo del Arroyo from 1923 to 1926, uncovering approximately half the structure. In his opinion, it was built by a group from Pueblo Bonito who moved there due to overcrowding. There are fourteen kivas at Pueblo del Arroyo, but no great kiva has been found at the site.

Coordinates: 36.0612°N 107.9657°W
