= Tsin Kletsin =

Tsin Kletsin or Tsin Kletzin is an Ancestral Puebloan great house and archaeological site located on top of South Mesa in Chaco Culture National Historical Park, northwestern New Mexico, United States. It is located 3.2 kilometers south of Pueblo Bonito. Tree-ring dating placed the construction around 1110-1115 A.D. Originally it contained 81 rooms, 3 kivas and a plaza constructed to create a 2-story structure. The plaza was enclosed by a wall, and a 1-meter-wide entry portal allowed access to the plaza from the south. The masonry style of this complex is called McElmo (Chaco-McElmo), characterized by large sandstone blocks and some tubular slabs. Some 800 meters north-east from Tsin Kletsin there is Weritos Dam. Its alleged role was to retain the storm water runoff in a reservoir that archaeologists Lagasse, Gillespie and Eggert suggest provided Tsin Kletsin with all of its domestic water. However, massive amounts of silt accumulated during flash floods would have forced the residents to regularly (10–15 years) rebuild the dam and dredge the drainage channel, and perhaps as early as every 2 years the water might have overflowed the dam causing some flooding.

Tsin Kletsin is accessible through the South Mesa Trail, 2.6 mi (4.2 km) round trip starting at Casa Rinconada; however, tourists typically do not visit there.

== Etymology ==
Tsin Kletsin is a misspelled version of Navajo Tsin Łizhin meaning "black wood place" or "charcoal place."

Coordinates: 36.0364°N 107.9578°W
