= Nuevo Alto =

Nuevo Alto is an Ancestral Puebloan great house and archaeological site located in Chaco Canyon, in the US state of New Mexico.

It was built on the north mesa near Pueblo Alto, and was founded in the late 12th century, a time when the Chacoan population was declining; it was part of a new wave, beginning in the AD 1080s, of great houses that were more compact and had different architecture than previous complexes. None of the ancient Chacoan roads leads to Nuevo Alto.

Coordinates: 36.0698°N 107.9598°W
