= Casa Chiquita =

Great house and archaeological site in the US

Casa Chiquita ("Small House") is an Ancestral Puebloan great house and archaeological site located in Chaco Canyon, northwestern New Mexico, United States.

Located near the old north entrance to the canyon, its layout features a smaller profile with a square block of rooms surrounding a central elevated round room, or kiva. It also lacked the open plazas and separate kivas of its predecessors. Larger, squarer blocks of stone were used in the masonry; its kivas were designed in the northern Mesa Verdean tradition. Its ruins now lie within Chaco Culture National Historical Park.

Coordinates: 36.0691°N 107.9766°W
