= Kin Kletso =

Archaeological site in New Mexico, US

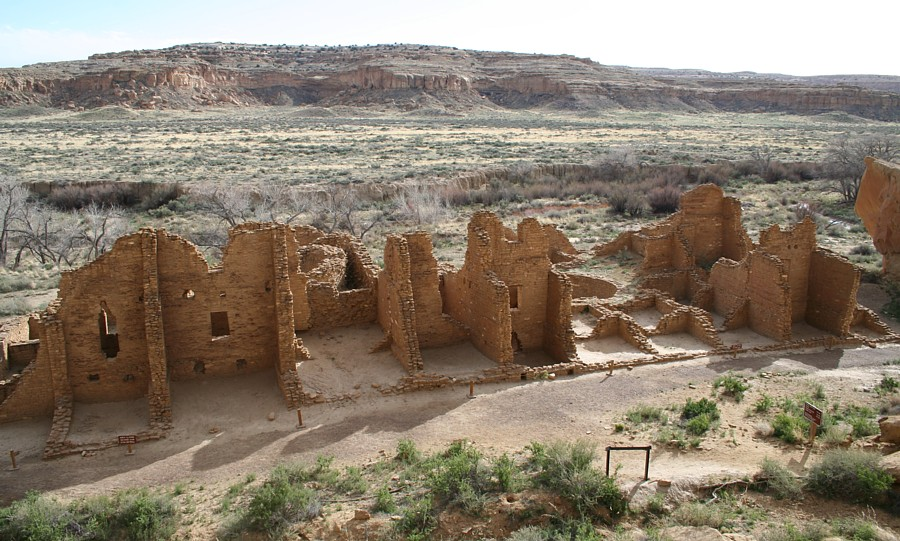
Kin Kletso Great House in Chaco Canyon, New Mexico

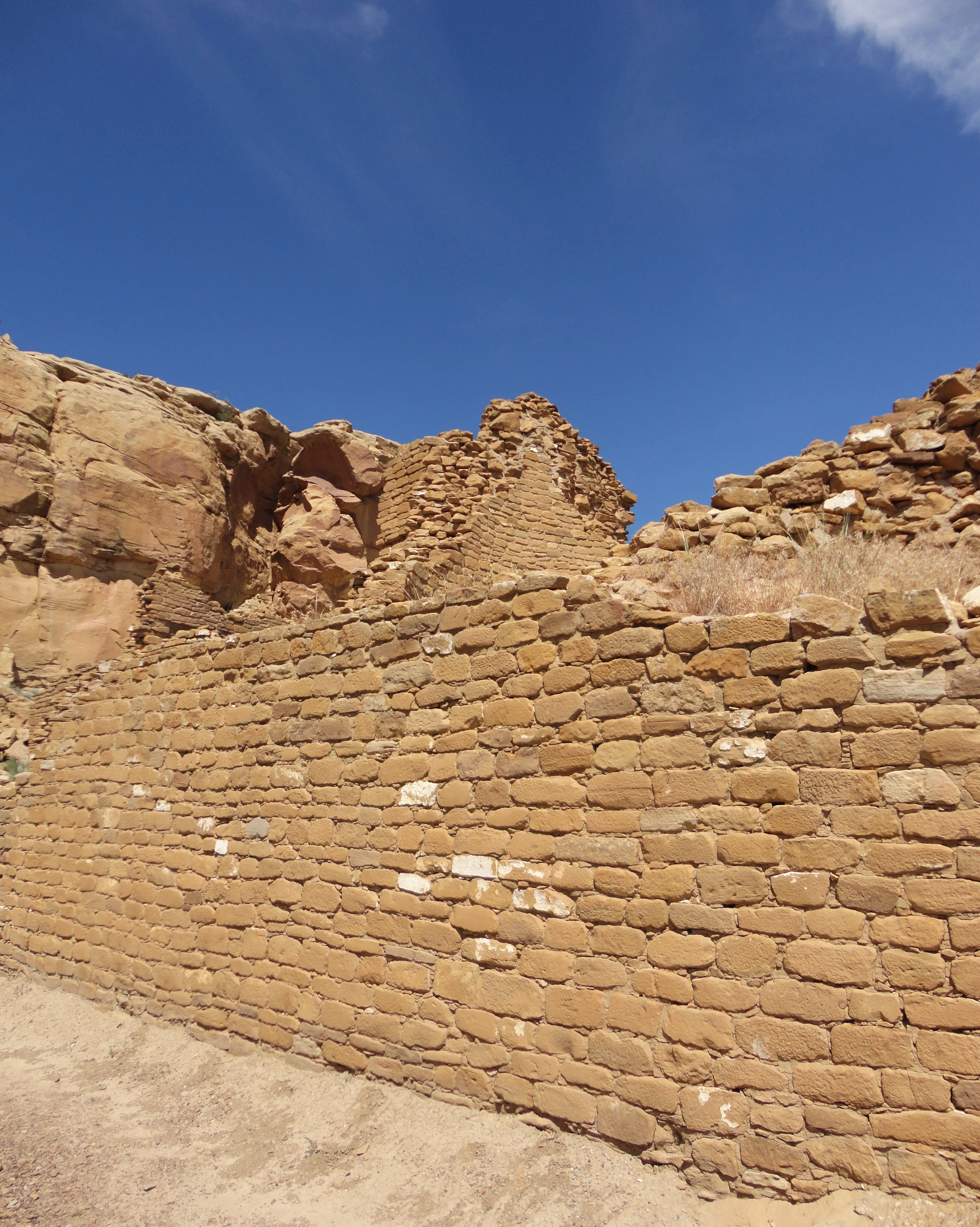
McElmo style masonry at Kin Kletso

Kin Kletso is a Chacoan Ancestral Pueblo great house and notable archaeological site located in Chaco Culture National Historical Park, 25 miles (40 km) southwest of Nageezi, New Mexico, United States.

== Description ==
Kin Kletso was a medium-sized great house located 0.5 miles (0.8 km) west of Pueblo Bonito; it shows strong evidence of construction and occupation by Pueblo peoples who migrated to Chaco from the northern San Juan Basin between 1125 and 1200 CE (a period known as the McElmo Phase of Chacoan Architecture). The house was erected between 1125 and 1130. Evidence of an obsidian production industry was discovered on the site.

From its masonry work, rectangular shape and design Kletso is identified as Pueblo III architecture by prominent Chaco archaeologists Stephen H. Lekson and Tom Windes. They also argue that this great house was only occupied by one or two households. Fagen writes that Kletso contained around 55 rooms, four ground-floor kivas, and a two-story cylindrical tower that may have functioned as a kiva or religious center.

== Etymology ==
Kin Kletso is a garbled mispronunciation of Kin Łitsooí, meaning "Yellow House" in the Navajo language.

Coordinates: 36.0652°N 107.9700°W
