= Hungo Pavi =

Archaeological site in New Mexico, US

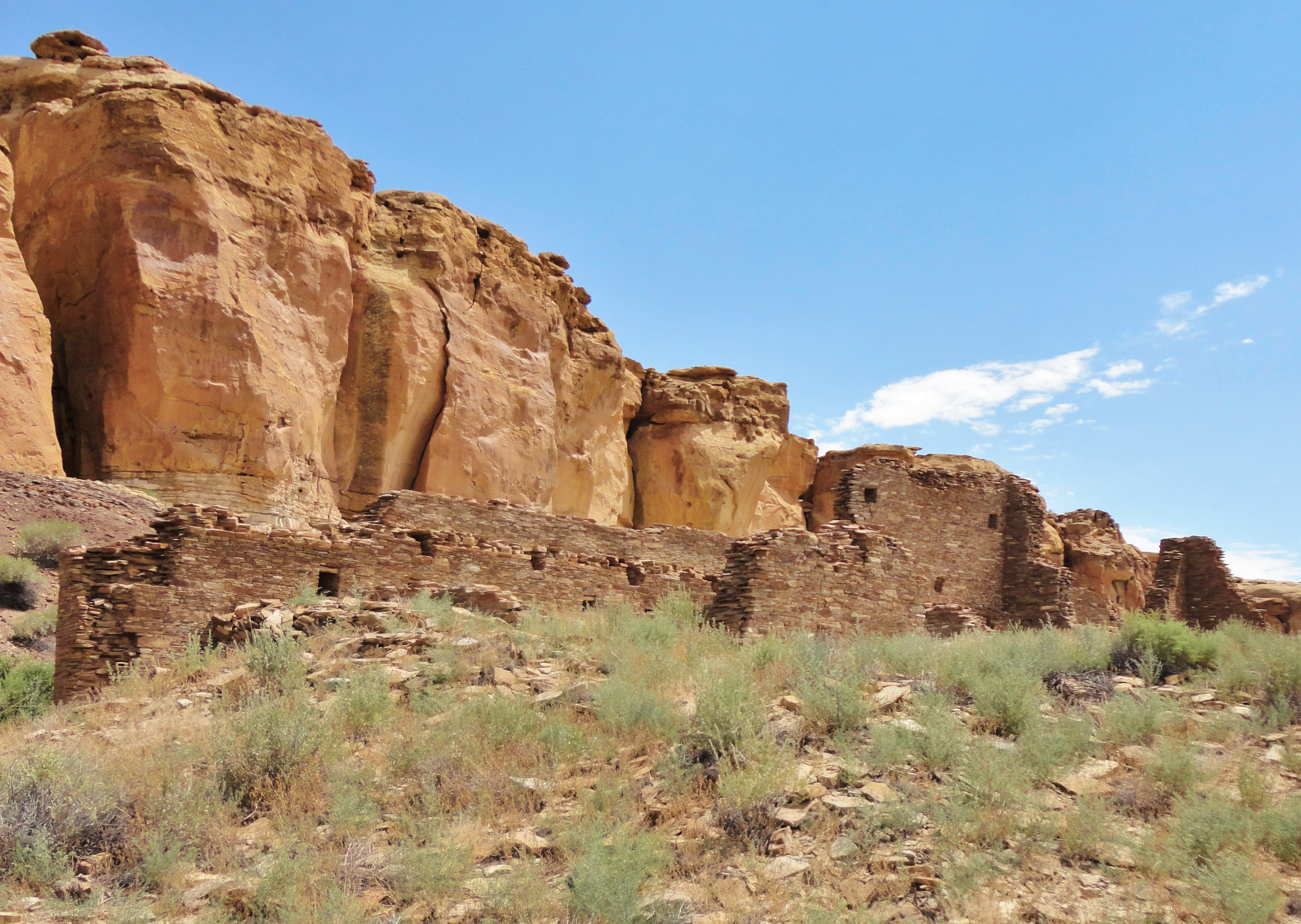
Hungo Pavi

Hungo Pavi is an Ancestral Puebloan great house and archaeological site located in Chaco Canyon, northwestern New Mexico, United States. A set of ruins located just 1 mile (2 km) from the ruins of Una Vida, Hungo Pavi measured 872 feet (266 m) in circumference. Initial explorations revealed 72 ground-level rooms, with structures reaching four stories in height. One large circular kiva has been identified. Its ruins now lie within Chaco Culture National Historical Park.

Coordinates: 36°03′00″N 107°55′48″W
