= Chaco Culture National Historical Park =

U.S. national park in New Mexico

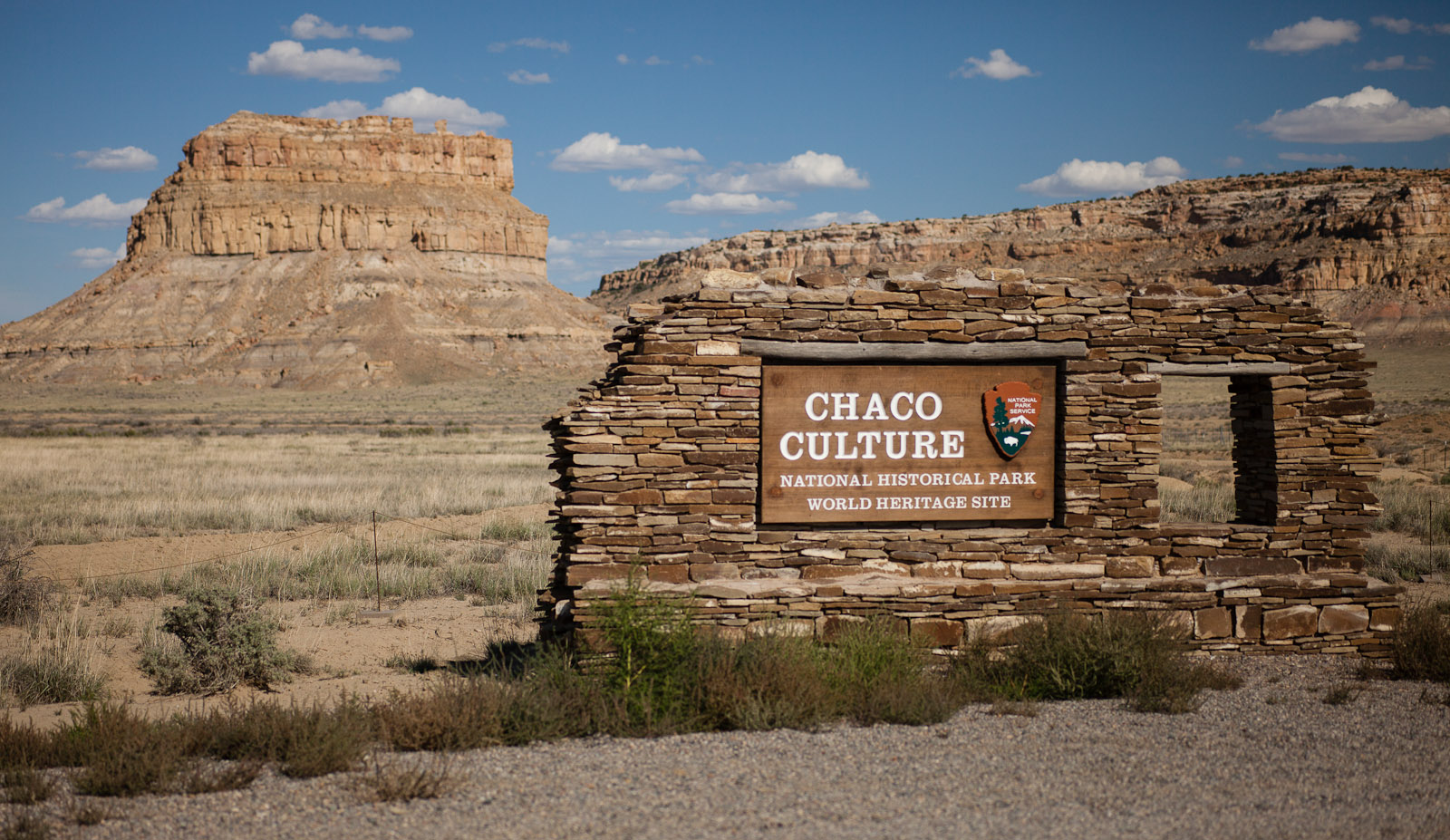
- Park entrance

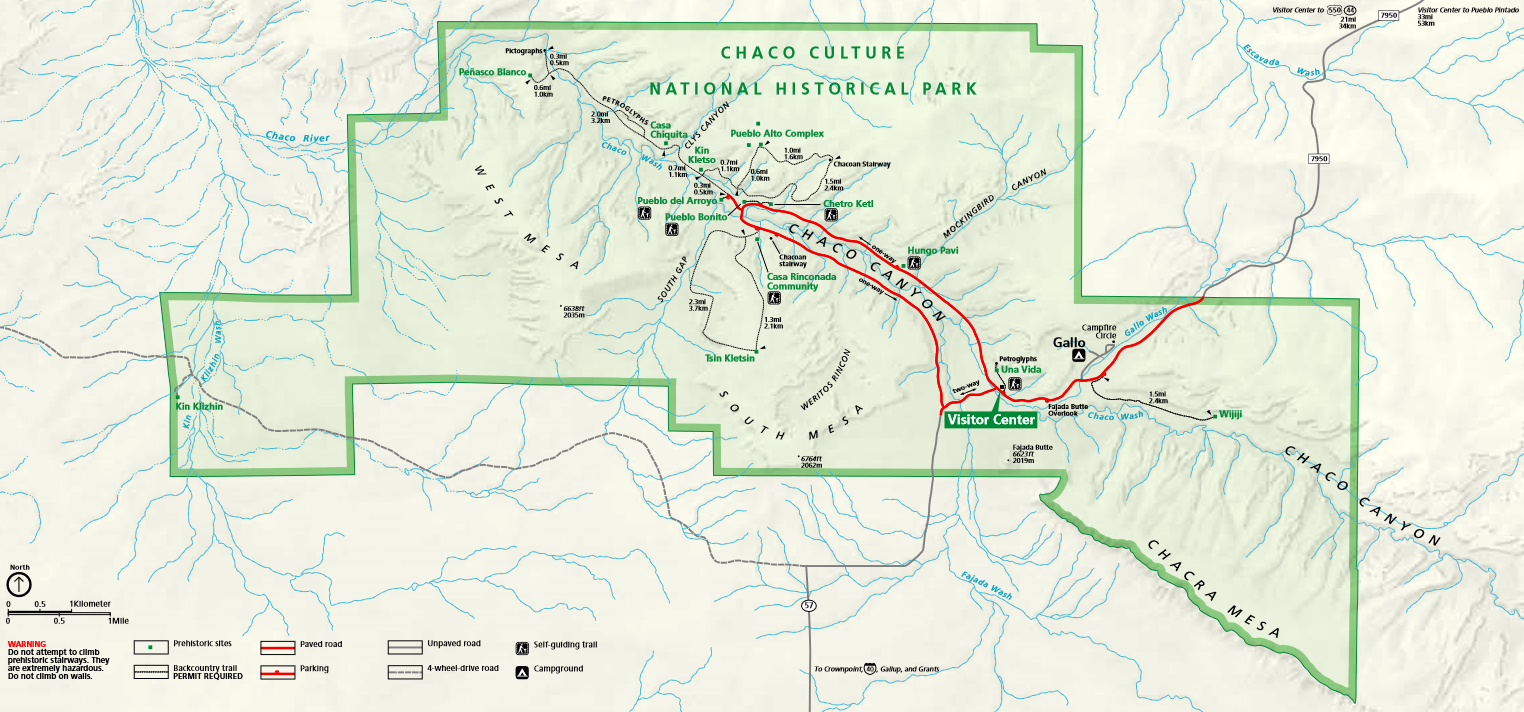
- Park map

- Location within New Mexico Location within the United States
- 36.06°N 107.96°W
- Location: San Juan County and McKinley County, New Mexico, US

Site notes
- Area: 33,977.8 acres (137.50 km^{2})
- Architectural style: Ancient Puebloan
- Governing body: National Park Service
- Visitors: 41,594 (in 2022)
- Website: Chaco Culture National Historical Park

UNESCO World Heritage Site
- Type: Cultural
- Criteria: iii
- Designated: 1987 (11th session)
- Part of: Chaco Culture
- Reference no.: 353
- Region: Europe and North America

U.S. National Register of Historic Places
- Type: historic district
- Designated: October 15, 1966
- Reference no.: 66000895

U.S. National Monument
- Designated: March 11, 1907
- Delisted: December 19, 1980
- Designated by: President Theodore Roosevelt

U.S. National Historical Park
- Designated: December 19, 1980

NM State Register of Cultural Properties
- Designated: May 21, 1971
- Reference no.: 57

Chaco Culture National Historical Park is a United States National Historical Park in the American Southwest hosting a large concentration of pre-Columbian indigenous ruins of pueblos. The park is in northwestern New Mexico, between Albuquerque and Farmington, in a remote canyon cut by the Chaco Wash. Containing the most sweeping collection of ancient ruins north of Mexico, the park preserves one of the most important cultural and historical areas in the United States.

Between 900 and 1150, Chaco Canyon was a major cultural center for the Ancestral Puebloans. (Note: The question of how to date Chacoan ruins was tackled by A. E. Douglass, the earliest practitioner of dendrochronology; consequently, the developmental chronology of Chaco Canyon's ruins is now the world's most extensively researched and accurate.) Chacoans quarried sandstone blocks and hauled timber from great distances, assembling 15 major complexes that remained the largest buildings ever built in North America until the 19th century. Climate change is thought to have led to the migration of Chacoans and the eventual abandonment of the canyon, beginning with a 50-year drought that began in 1130.

The Chacoan cultural sites, situated in the arid, sparsely populated Four Corners region, are fragile. Concerns about erosion caused by tourists have led to the closure of Fajada Butte to the public. The sites are considered sacred ancestral homelands by the Hopi and Pueblo peoples, who maintain oral accounts of their historical migration from Chaco and their spiritual relationship to the land. Park preservation efforts can conflict with native religious beliefs, but tribal representatives work closely with the National Park Service to share their knowledge and respect for the heritage of the Chacoan culture.

Evidence of archaeoastronomy at Chaco has been proposed, with the "Sun Dagger" petroglyph at Fajada Butte a well-known example. Many Chacoan buildings appear to have been aligned to capture the solar and lunar cycles, requiring generations of astronomical observations and centuries of skillfully-coordinated construction.

The park is part of Chaco Culture World Heritage Site, and is on the Trails of the Ancients Byway, one of the designated New Mexico Scenic Byways.

== History ==
=== Archaic–Early Basketmakers ===
The first people in the San Juan Basin were hunter-gatherers: the Archaic–Early Basketmaker people. These small bands descended from nomadic Clovis big-game hunters who arrived in the Southwest around 10,000 BC. More than 70 campsites from this period, carbon-dated to the period 7000–1500 BC and mostly consisting of stone chips and other leavings, were found in Atlatl Cave and elsewhere within Chaco Canyon, with at least one of the sites located on the canyon floor near an exposed arroyo. The Archaic–Early Basketmaker people were nomadic or semi-nomadic hunter-gatherers who over time began making baskets to store gathered plants. By the end of the period, some people cultivated food. Excavation of their campsites and rock shelters has revealed that they made tools, gathered wild plants, and killed and processed game. Slab-lined storage cists indicate a change from a wholly nomadic lifestyle.

=== Ancestral Puebloans ===
Anasazi sites in the Southwest

By 900 BC, Archaic people lived at Atlatl Cave and similar sites.

DNA evidence establishes the people of Picuris Pueblo once lived in Chaco Canyon. By AD 490, the descendants of those who lived in Chaco Canyon, of the Late Basketmaker II period, farmed lands around Shabik'eshchee Village and other pit-house settlements at Chaco.

A small population of Basketmakers remained in the Chaco Canyon area. The broad arc of their cultural elaboration culminated around 800, during the Pueblo I period, when they were building crescent-shaped stone complexes, each comprising four to five residential suites abutting subterranean kivas, large enclosed areas reserved for rites. Such structures characterize the Early Pueblo People. By 850, the Ancient Pueblo population had rapidly expanded: groups resided in larger, more densely populated pueblos. Strong evidence attests to a canyon-wide turquoise processing and trading industry dating from the tenth century. Around then, the first section of Pueblo Bonito was built: a curved row of 50 rooms near its present north wall. Archaeogenomic analysis of the mitochondria of nine skeletons from high-status graves in Pueblo Bonito determined that members of an elite matriline were interred here for approximately 330 years between 800 and 1130, suggesting continuity with the matrilineal succession practices of many Pueblo nations today.

The cohesive Chacoan system began to unravel around 1140, perhaps triggered by an extreme 50-year drought that began in 1130; chronic climatic instability, including a series of severe droughts, struck the region again between 1250 and 1450. Poor water management led to arroyo cutting; deforestation was extensive and economically devastating: timber for construction had to be hauled instead from outlying mountain ranges such as the Chuska mountains, more than 50 miles (80 km) to the west. Outlying communities began to depopulate and by the end of the century the buildings in the central canyon had been neatly sealed and abandoned.

Some scholars suggest that violence and warfare, perhaps involving cannibalism, impelled the evacuations. Dismembered bodies dating from Chacoan times were found at two sites in the central canyon. Yet Chacoan complexes showed little evidence of being defended or defensively sited high on cliff faces or atop mesas. Only several minor sites at Chaco have evidence of the large-scale burning that would suggest enemy raids. Archaeological and cultural evidence leads scientists to believe people from this region migrated south, east, and west into the valleys and drainages of the Little Colorado River, the Rio Puerco, and the Rio Grande. Anthropologist Joseph Tainter deals at length with the structure and decline of Chaco civilization in his 1988 study The Collapse of Complex Societies.

=== Athabaskan succession ===
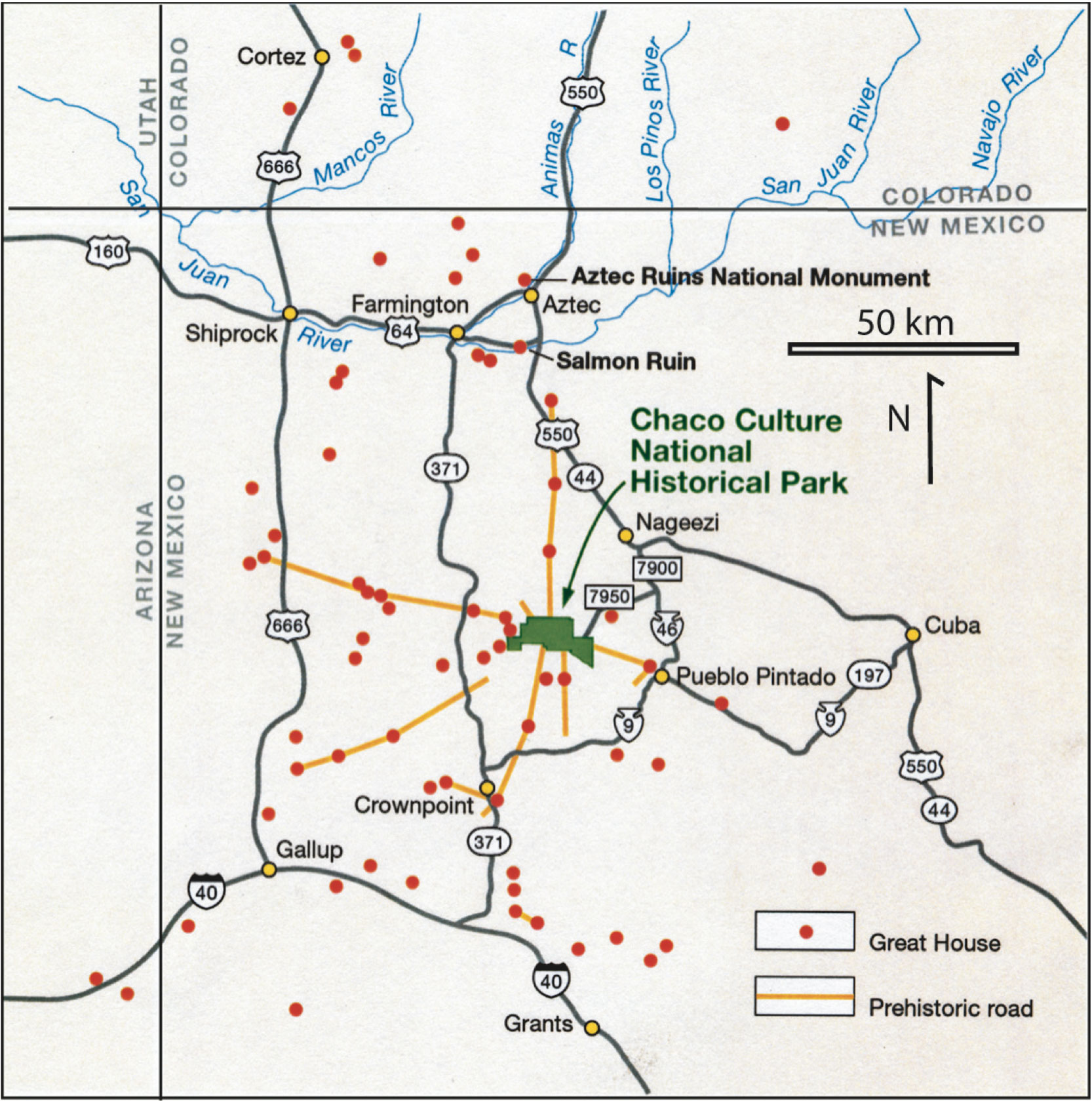
Prehistoric roads and great houses in the San Juan Basin, superimposed on a map showing modern roads and settlements

Numic-speaking peoples, such as the Ute and Shoshone, were present on the Colorado Plateau beginning in the 12th century. Nomadic Southern Athabaskan-speaking peoples, such as the Apache and Navajo, succeeded the Pueblo people in this region by the 15th century. In the process, they acquired Chacoan customs and agricultural skills. Ute tribal groups also frequented the region, primarily during hunting and raiding expeditions. The modern Navajo Nation lies west of Chaco Canyon, and many Navajo live in surrounding areas.

=== Excavation and protection ===
The first documented trip through Chaco Canyon was an 1823 expedition led by New Mexican governor José Antonio Vizcarra when the area was under Mexican rule. He noted several large ruins in the canyon. The American trader Josiah Gregg wrote about the ruins of Chaco Canyon, referring in 1832 to Pueblo Bonito as "built of fine-grit sandstone". In 1849, a U.S. Army detachment passed through and surveyed the ruins, following United States acquisition of the Southwest with its victory in the Mexican War in 1848. The canyon was so remote, however, that it was scarcely visited over the next 50 years. After brief reconnaissance work by Smithsonian scholars in the 1870s, formal archaeological work began in 1896 when a party from the American Museum of Natural History based in New York City—the Hyde Exploring Expedition—began excavating Pueblo Bonito. Spending five summers in the region, they sent more than 60,000 artifacts back to New York and operated a series of trading posts in the area.

In 1901 Richard Wetherill, who had worked for the Hyde expedition, claimed a homestead of 161 acres (65 ha) that included Pueblo Bonito, Pueblo del Arroyo, and Chetro Ketl. While investigating Wetherill's land claim, federal land agent Samuel J. Holsinger detailed the physical setting of the canyon and the sites, noted prehistoric road segments and stairways above Chetro Ketl, and documented prehistoric dams and irrigation systems. His report went unpublished and unheeded. It urged the creation of a national park to safeguard Chacoan sites.

The next year, Edgar Lee Hewett, president of New Mexico Normal University (later renamed New Mexico Highlands University), mapped many Chacoan sites. Hewett and others helped enact the Federal Antiquities Act of 1906, the first U.S. law to protect relics; it was, in effect, a direct consequence of Wetherill's controversial activities at Chaco (including amateur excavations, reuse of ruin materials for building, and a large livestock ranching operation). The Act also authorized the president to establish national monuments: on March 11, 1907, Theodore Roosevelt proclaimed Chaco Canyon National Monument. Wetherill relinquished his land claims.

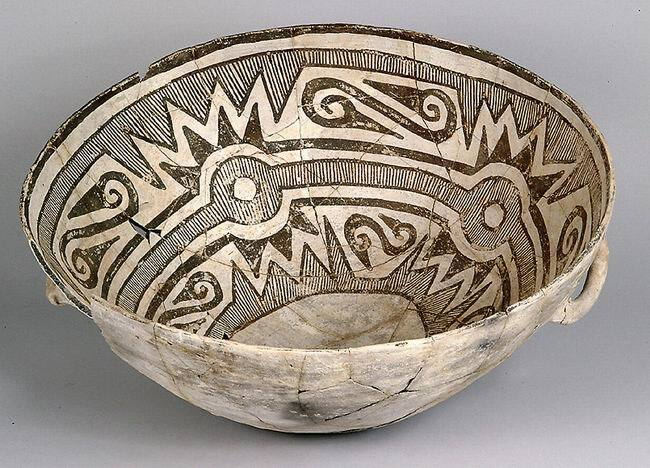
A ceramic bowl excavated from Pueblo Alto, dating from AD 1030 to 1200

In 1920, the National Geographic Society began an archaeological examination of Chaco Canyon and appointed Neil Judd to head the project. After a reconnaissance trip that year, Judd proposed to excavate Pueblo Bonito, the largest ruin at Chaco. Beginning in 1921, Judd spent seven field seasons at Chaco. Living and working conditions were spartan at best. In his memoir, Judd wrote, "Chaco Canyon has its limitations as a summer resort". By 1925, his excavators had removed 100,000 short tons of overburden, using a team of "35 or more Indians, ten white men, and eight or nine horses". The team found only 69 hearths in the ruin, a puzzling discovery as winters are cold at Chaco. Judd sent A. E. Douglass more than 90 specimens for tree-ring dating, then in its infancy. At that time, Douglass had only a "floating" chronology. Only in 1929 did a Judd-led team find the "missing link". Most of the beams used at Chaco were cut between 1033 and 1092, the height of construction there.

In 1949, the University of New Mexico deeded over adjoining lands to form an expanded Chaco Canyon National Monument. In return, the university maintained scientific research rights to the area. By 1959, the National Park Service had constructed a park visitor center, staff housing, and campgrounds. As a historic property of the National Park Service, the National Monument was listed on the National Register of Historic Places on October 15, 1966. In 1971, researchers Robert Lister and James Judge established the "Chaco Center", a division for cultural research that functioned as a joint project between the University of New Mexico and the National Park Service. A number of multidisciplinary research projects, archaeological surveys, and limited excavations began during this time. The Chaco Center extensively surveyed the Chacoan roads, well-constructed and strongly reinforced thoroughfares radiating from the central canyon.

The richness of the cultural remains at park sites led to the expansion of the small National Monument into the Chaco Culture National Historical Park on December 19, 1980, when 13,000 acres (5,300 ha) were added to the protected area. In 1987, UNESCO designated the park a World Heritage Site. To safeguard Chacoan sites on adjacent Bureau of Land Management and Navajo Nation lands, the Park Service developed the multi-agency Chaco Culture Archaeological Protection Site program. These initiatives have identified more than 2,400 archeological sites within the current park's boundaries, only a small fraction of which have been excavated.

== Sites ==
The Chacoans built their complexes along a 9-mile (14 km) stretch of canyon floor, with the walls of some structures aligned cardinally and others aligned with the 18.6-year cycle of minimum and maximum moonrise and moonset.

=== Central canyon ===
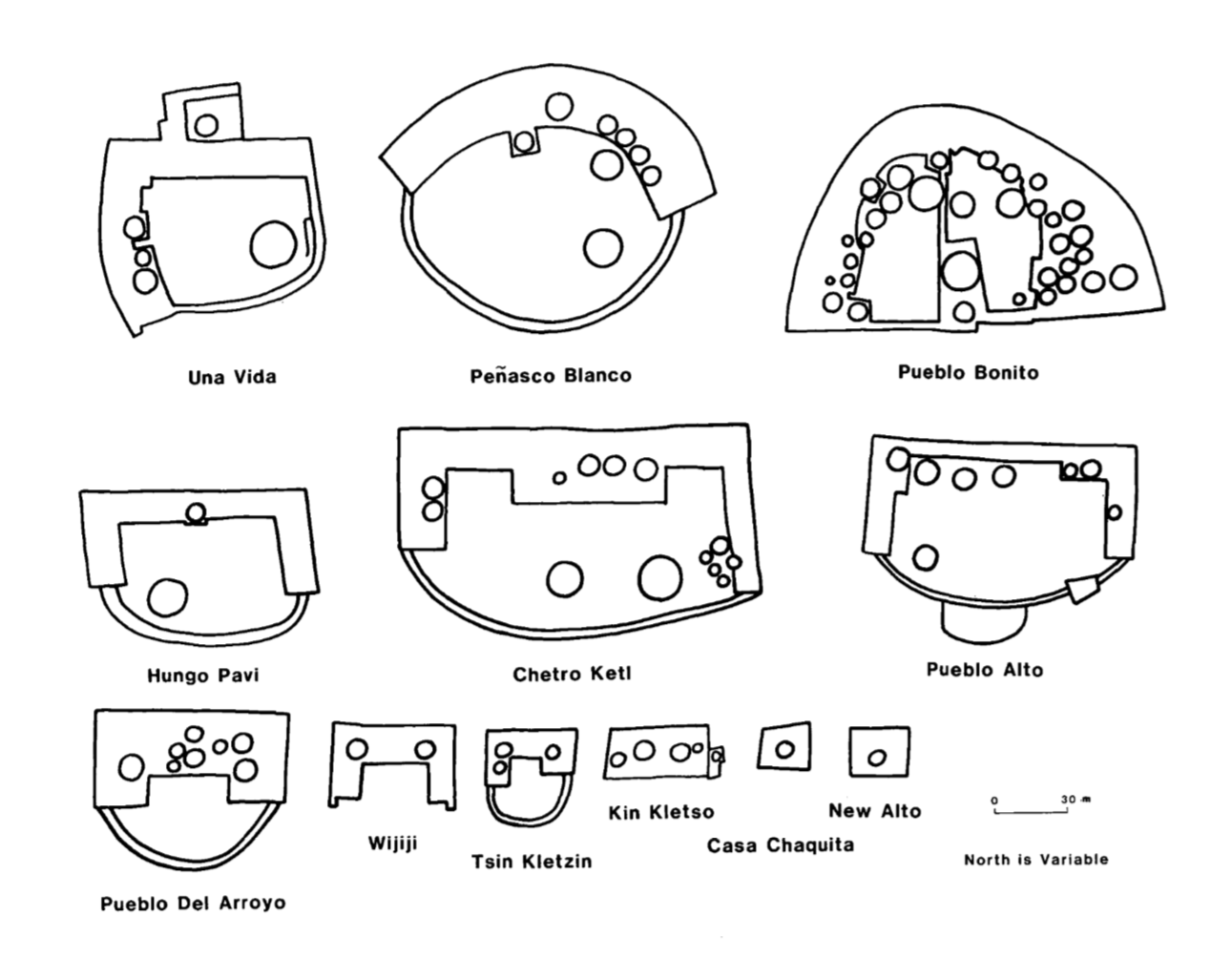
NPS site maps of the major ruins of Chaco Canyon

The central portion of the canyon contains the largest Chacoan complexes. The most studied is Pueblo Bonito. Covering almost 2 acres (0.81 ha) and comprising at least 650 rooms, it is the largest great house; in parts of the complex, the structure was four stories high. The builders' use of core-and-veneer architecture and multi-story construction necessitated massive masonry walls up to 3 ft (91 cm) thick. Pueblo Bonito is divided into two sections by a wall precisely aligned to run north–south, bisecting the central plaza. A great kiva was placed on either side of the wall, creating a symmetrical pattern common to many Chacoan great houses. The scale of the complex, upon completion, rivaled that of the Colosseum. Nearby is Pueblo del Arroyo, which was founded between AD 1050 and 1075 and completed in the early 12th century; it sits at a drainage outlet known as South Gap.

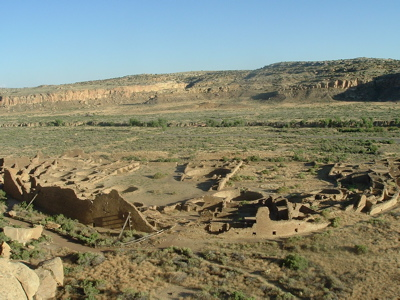
Pueblo Bonito, largest of the great houses, abuts the foot of Chaco Canyon's northern rim.

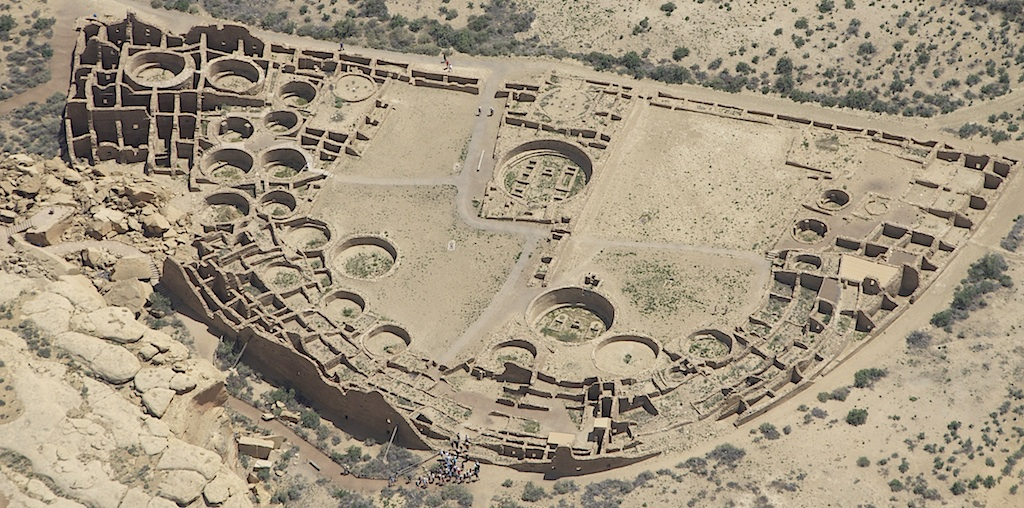
Aerial view of Pueblo Bonito

Casa Rinconada, isolated from the other central sites, sits to the south side of Chaco Wash, adjacent to a Chacoan road leading to a set of steep stairs that reached the top of Chacra Mesa. Its sole kiva stands alone, with no residential or support structures whatsoever; it did once have a 39 ft (12 m) passageway leading from the underground kiva to several above-ground levels. Chetro Ketl, located near Pueblo Bonito, bears the typical 'D'-shape of many other central complexes. Begun between 1020 and 1050, its 450–550 rooms shared one great kiva. Experts estimate that it took 29,135 man-hours to erect Chetro Ketl alone; Hewett estimated that it took the wood of 5,000 trees and 50 million stone blocks.

Kin Kletso ("Yellow House") was a medium-sized complex located 0.5 miles (800 m) west of Pueblo Bonito. It shows strong evidence of construction and occupation by Pueblo peoples from the northern San Juan Basin. Its rectangular shape and design is related to the Pueblo II cultural group, rather than the Pueblo III style or its Chacoan variant. It contains 55 rooms, four ground-floor kivas, and a two-story cylindrical tower that may have functioned as a kiva or religious center. Evidence of an obsidian-processing industry was discovered near the village, which was erected between 1125 and 1130.

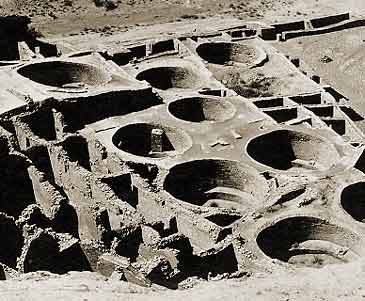
Chaco's smaller kivas numbered around 100, each hosting rituals for 50–100 worshipers; the 15 much larger "great kivas" each held up to 400.

Pueblo Alto is a great house of 89 rooms located on a mesa top near the middle of Chaco Canyon, 0.6 miles (1 km) from Pueblo Bonito; it was begun between AD 1020 and 1050 during a wider building boom throughout the canyon. Its location made the community visible to most of the inhabitants of the San Juan Basin; indeed, it was only 2.3 miles (3.7 km) north of Tsin Kletzin, on the opposite side of the canyon. The community was the center of a bead- and turquoise-processing industry that influenced the development of all villages in the canyon; chert tool production was common. Research at the site conducted by archaeologist Tom Windes suggests only a handful of families, perhaps as few as five to twenty, lived in the complex; this may imply that Pueblo Alto served a primarily non-residential role. Another great house, Nuevo Alto, was built on the north mesa near Pueblo Alto; it was founded in the late 12th century, a time when the Chacoan population was declining.

=== Outliers ===
Another cluster of great houses lies in Chaco's northern reaches; among the largest is Casa Chiquita ("Small House"), a village built in the 1080s, when, in a period of ample rainfall, Chacoan culture was expanding. Its layout featured a smaller, squarer profile; it also lacked the open plazas and separate kivas of its predecessors. Larger, squarer blocks of stone were used in the masonry; kivas were designed in the northern Mesa Verdean tradition. Two miles down the canyon is Peñasco Blanco ("White Bluff"), an arc-shaped compound built atop the canyon's southern rim in five distinct stages between 900 and 1125. A nearby cliff painting (the "Supernova Platograph") may record the sighting of the SN 1054 supernova on July 5, 1054. (Note: The Crab Nebula, now a supernova remnant in the constellation of Taurus, was the result of the event in question; the original supernova attained peak brilliance on the date that the Chacoans presumably sighted it.)

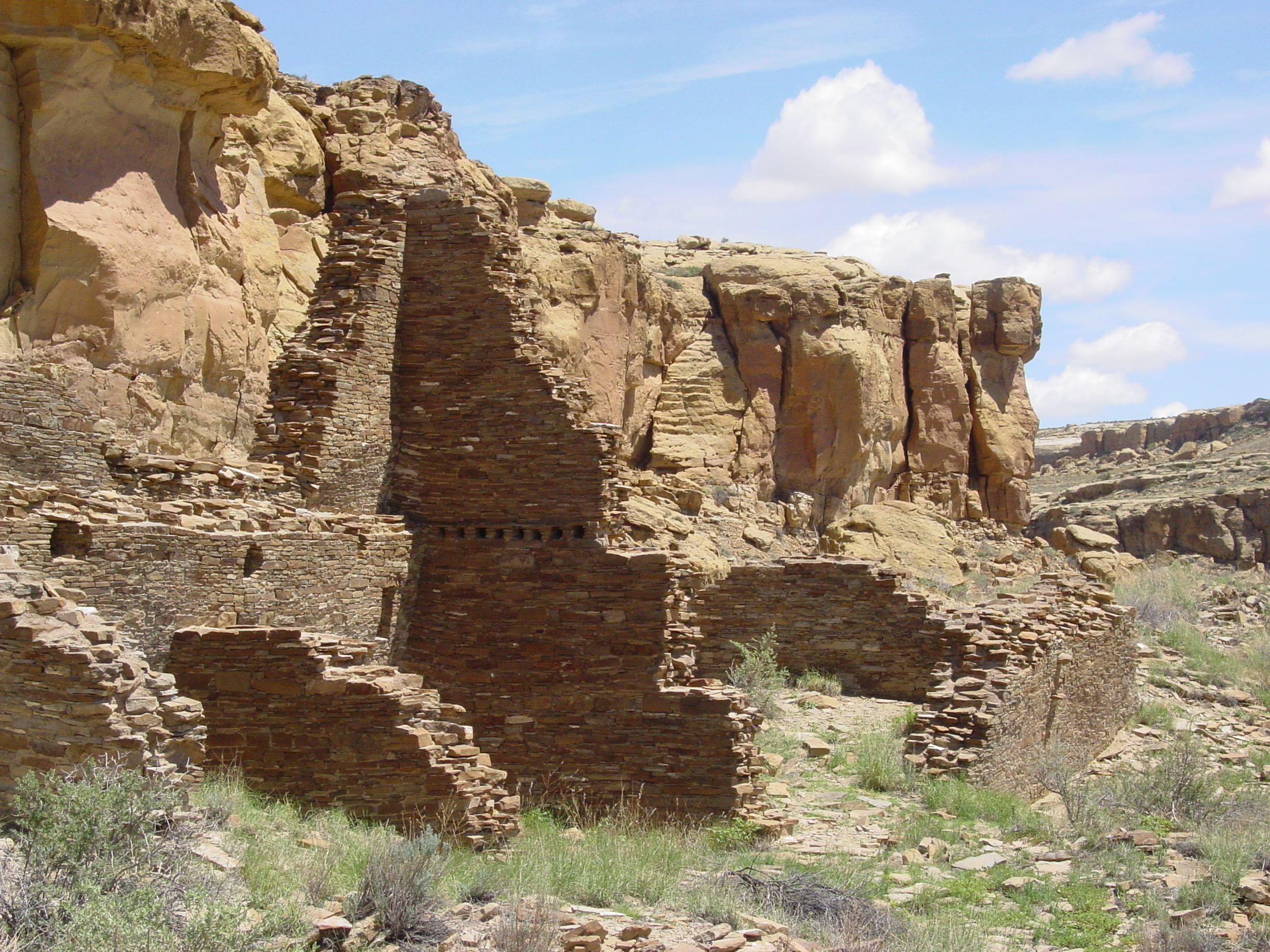
Hungo Pavi, near the center of Chaco Canyon. A staircase leads out of the complex.

Hungo Pavi, located 1 mile (1.6 km) from Una Vida, measured 872 ft (266 m) in circumference. Initial probes revealed 72 ground-level rooms, with structures reaching four stories in height; one large circular kiva has been identified. Kin Nahasbas, built in either the 9th or 10th century, is sited slightly north of Una Vida, positioned at the foot of the north mesa. Limited excavation of it has taken place. Tsin Kletzin ("Charcoal Place"), a compound located on the Chacra Mesa and positioned above Casa Rinconada, is 2.3 miles (3.7 km) due south of Pueblo Alto, on the opposite side of the canyon. Nearby is Weritos Dam, a massive earthen structure that scientists believe provided Tsin Kletzin with all of its domestic water. The dam worked by retaining stormwater runoff in a reservoir. Massive amounts of silt accumulated during flash floods would have forced the residents to regularly rebuild the dam and dredge the catchment area.

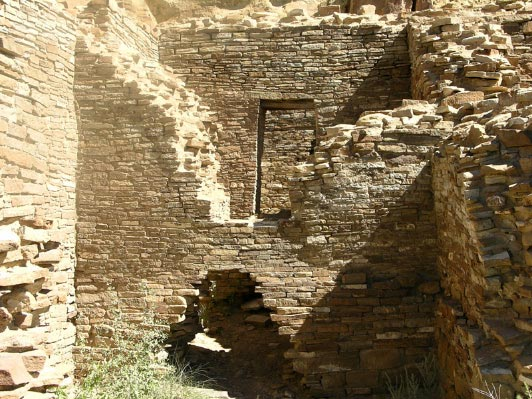
Interior of Wijiji, an outlier site occupied between AD 1100 and 1150

Deeper in the canyon, Una Vida ("One Life") is one of the three oldest great houses; construction began around 900. Comprising at least two stories and 124 rooms, it shares an arc or D-shaped design with its contemporaries, Peñasco Blanco and Pueblo Bonito, but has a unique "dog leg" addition made necessary by topography. It is located in one of the canyon's major side drainages, near Gallo Wash, and was massively expanded after 930. Wijiji ("black greasewood"), comprising just more than one hundred rooms, is the smallest of the great houses. Built between 1110 and 1115, it was the last Chacoan great house to be constructed. Somewhat isolated within the narrow wash, it is positioned 1 mi (1.6 km) from neighboring Una Vida. Directly north are communities even more remote: Salmon Ruins and Aztec Ruins, sited on the San Juan and Animas Rivers near Farmington, were built during a thirty-year wet period commencing in 1100. Some 60 miles (97 km) directly south of Chaco Canyon, on the Great South Road, lies another cluster of outlying communities. The largest, Kin Nizhoni, stands atop a 7,000-foot (2,100 m) mesa surrounded by marshy bottomlands.

Casamero Pueblo is located on McKinley County Road 19, near Tecolote Mesa, a red sandstone mesa. It was connected to its nearby outlier, Andrews Ranch, by a Chacoan road. Chaco Canyon, Aztec Ruins, Salmon Ruins, and Casamero Pueblo are on the Trail of the Ancients Scenic Byway.

== Ruins ==
=== Great houses ===
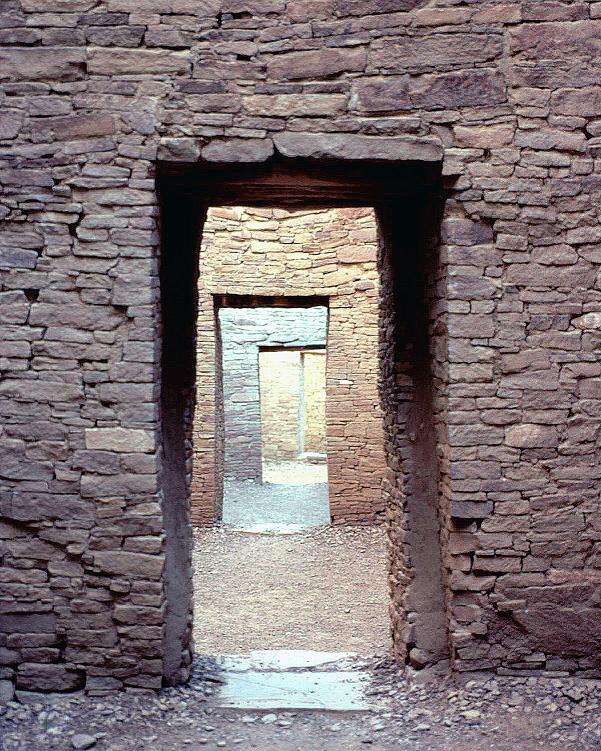
Doorways, Pueblo Bonito

Immense complexes known as "great houses" embodied worship at Chaco. The Chacoans used masonry techniques unique for their time, and their building constructions lasted decades and even centuries. As architectural forms evolved and centuries passed, the houses kept several core traits. Most apparent is their sheer bulk; complexes averaged more than 200 rooms each, and some enclosed up to 700 rooms. Individual rooms were substantial in size, with higher ceilings than Ancestral Puebloan works of preceding periods. They were well-planned: vast sections or wings erected were finished in a single stage, rather than in increments. Houses generally faced the south, and plaza areas were almost always girt with edifices of sealed-off rooms or high walls. Houses often stood four or five stories tall, with single-story rooms facing the plaza; room blocks were terraced to allow the tallest sections to compose the pueblo's rear edifice. Rooms were often organized into suites, with front rooms larger than rear, interior, and storage rooms or areas.

Ceremonial structures known as kivas were built in proportion to the number of rooms in a pueblo. One small kiva was built for roughly every 29 rooms. Nine complexes each hosted an oversized great kiva, each up to 63 ft (19 m) in diameter. T-shaped doorways and stone lintels marked all Chacoan kivas. Although simple and compound walls were often used, great houses were primarily constructed of core-and-veneer walls: two parallel load-bearing walls comprising dressed, flat sandstone blocks bound in clay mortar were erected. Gaps between walls were packed with rubble, forming the wall's core. Walls were then covered in a veneer of small sandstone pieces, which were pressed into a layer of binding mud. These surfacing stones were often placed in distinctive patterns. The Chacoan structures altogether required the wood of 200,000 coniferous trees, mostly hauled—on foot—from mountain ranges up to 70 miles (110 km) away.

=== Uses ===
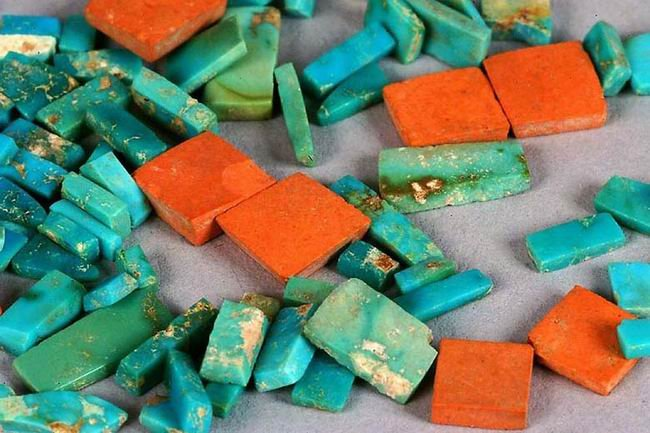
Around 200,000 pieces of turquoise have been excavated from the ruins at Chaco Canyon. These turquoise and argillite (red) inlay pieces were found at Pueblo Alto.

The meticulously designed buildings composing the larger Chacoan complexes did not emerge until around 1030. The Chacoans mixed pre-planned architectural designs, astronomical alignments, geometry, landscaping, and engineering into ancient urban centers of unique public architecture. Researchers have concluded that the complex may have had a relatively small residential population, with larger groups assembling only temporarily for annual ceremonies. Smaller sites, such as Hillside Ruin, apparently more residential in character, are scattered near the great houses in and around Chaco. The canyon runs along one of the lunar alignment lines, suggesting the location was originally chosen for its astronomical significance. This allowed alignment with several other key structures in the canyon.

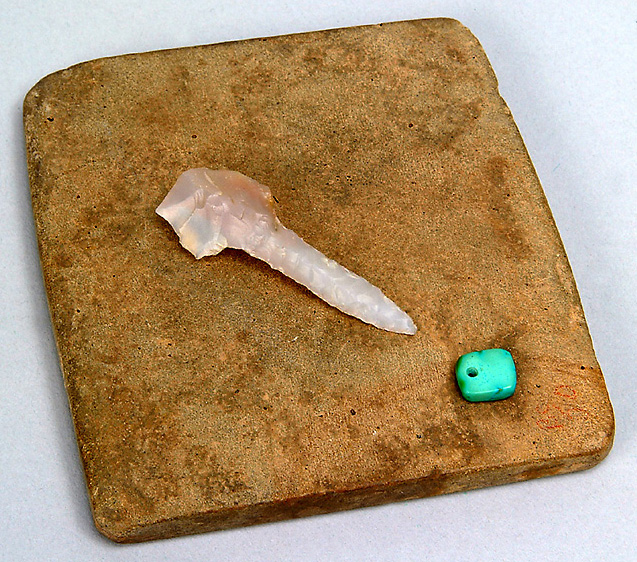
Chaco Canyon Ancestral Puebloan lapidary tool kit, NPS

Turquoise was very important to the people of Chaco. About 200,000 pieces of turquoise have been excavated from the ruins at Chaco Canyon, and workshops for local manufacture of turquoise beads have been found. The turquoise was used locally for grave goods, burials, and ceremonial offerings. More than 15,000 turquoise beads and pendants accompanied two burials at Pueblo Bonito. Some researchers found data supporting existence of widespread trade of the turquoise.

Around this time, the extended Ancestral Puebloan community experienced a population and construction boom. Throughout the 10th century, Chacoan building techniques spread from the canyon to neighboring regions. By AD 1115 at least 70 outlying pueblos of Chacoan provenance had been built within the 25,000 sq mi (65,000 km^{2}) composing the San Juan Basin. Experts speculate the function of these compounds, some large enough to be considered great houses in their own right. Some suggest they may have been more than agricultural communities, perhaps functioning as trading posts or ceremonial sites.

Thirty such outliers spread across 65,000 sq mi (170,000 km^{2}) are connected to the central canyon and to one another by an enigmatic web of six Chacoan road systems. Extending up to 60 mi (97 km) in generally straight routes, they appear to have been extensively surveyed and engineered. Their depressed and scraped caliche beds reach 30 ft (9.1 m) wide; earthen berms or rocks, at times composing low walls, delimit their edges. When necessary, the roads deploy steep stone stairways and rock ramps to surmount cliffs and other obstacles. Although their purpose may never be certain, archaeologist Harold S. Gladwin noted that nearby Navajo believe that the Chaco Canyon people built the roads to transport timber; archaeologist Neil Judd offered a similar hypothesis.

== Archaeoastronomy ==
=== Sun Dagger ===
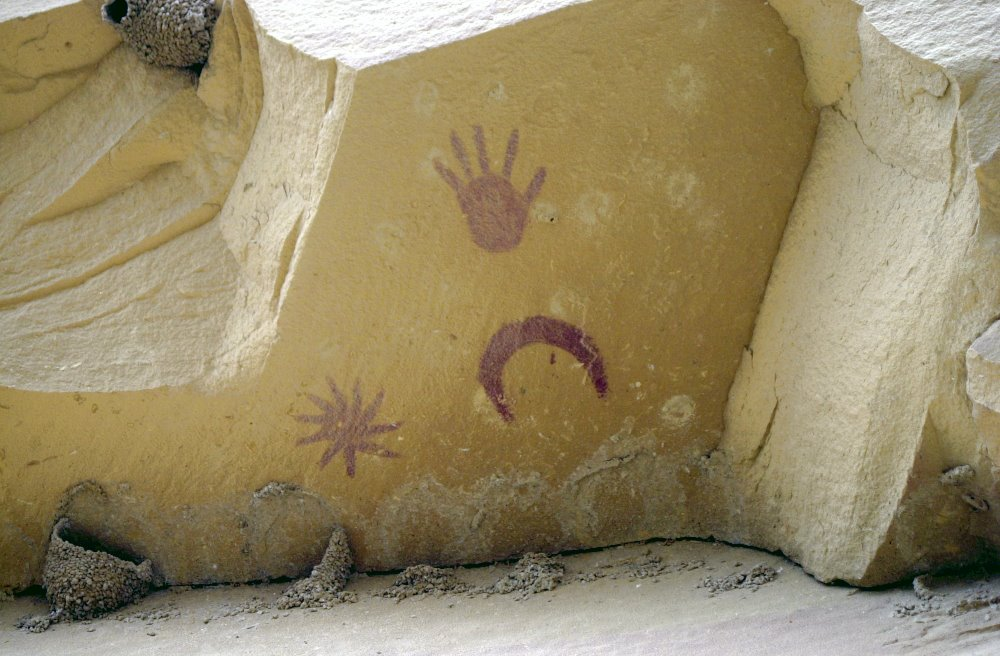
This 11th-century pictograph at Chaco Canyon may depict the supernova of AD 1054 This supernova and the Moon were in this configuration when the supernova was near its brightest. An imprint of a hand at the top signifies that this is a sacred place.

Two whorl-shaped etchings near the top of Fajada Butte compose what is called the "Sun Dagger" petroglyph that is tucked behind the eponymous rock panels of the "Three-Slab Site". They are symbolically focal.

It consists of two spirals—one principal and one ancillary. The latter left-hand spiral captured both spring and fall equinoxes; its artifice was revealed by a descending spear of light, filtered through the slabs, that shone upon it and split it in two. The former and larger whorl to its right was lit by the titular "sun dagger", which bisected it through another interplay of slab and sunlight. Light struck it, brilliantly, as the summer sun attains its solstice midday peak. The Chacoans were said to be marking, as Anna Sofaer, artist, "Sun Dagger" discoverer, and leading proponent puts it, "the middle of time". Each turn of the 9.25-turn large spiral was found to mark one year in the 18.6-year "lunar excursion cycle" of the rising mid-winter full moon. This record is kept by a slab-cast lunar shadow whose edge strikes in succession each ring. As the full "minimum moon" closest to the winter solstice rises, the shadow's edge precisely strikes the center of the larger spiral; it steps outward year by year, ring by ring, until it strikes the outermost edge of it during the full "maximum moon", again in mid-winter.

Fajada Butte bears five other petroglyphs—including a carving of a "rattlesnake", other spirals, and a rectangle—that are conspicuously lit by contrasts between sunbeams and shadows during equinoxes or solstices. Public access to the butte was curtailed when, in 1989, erosion from modern foot traffic was found to be responsible for one of the three screening slabs at the "Sun Dagger" site shifting out of its ancient position; the assemblage of stones has thus lost some of its former spatial and temporal precision as a solar and lunar calendar. In 1990 the screens were stabilized and placed under observation, but the wayward slab was not moved back into its original orientation.

=== Alignments ===
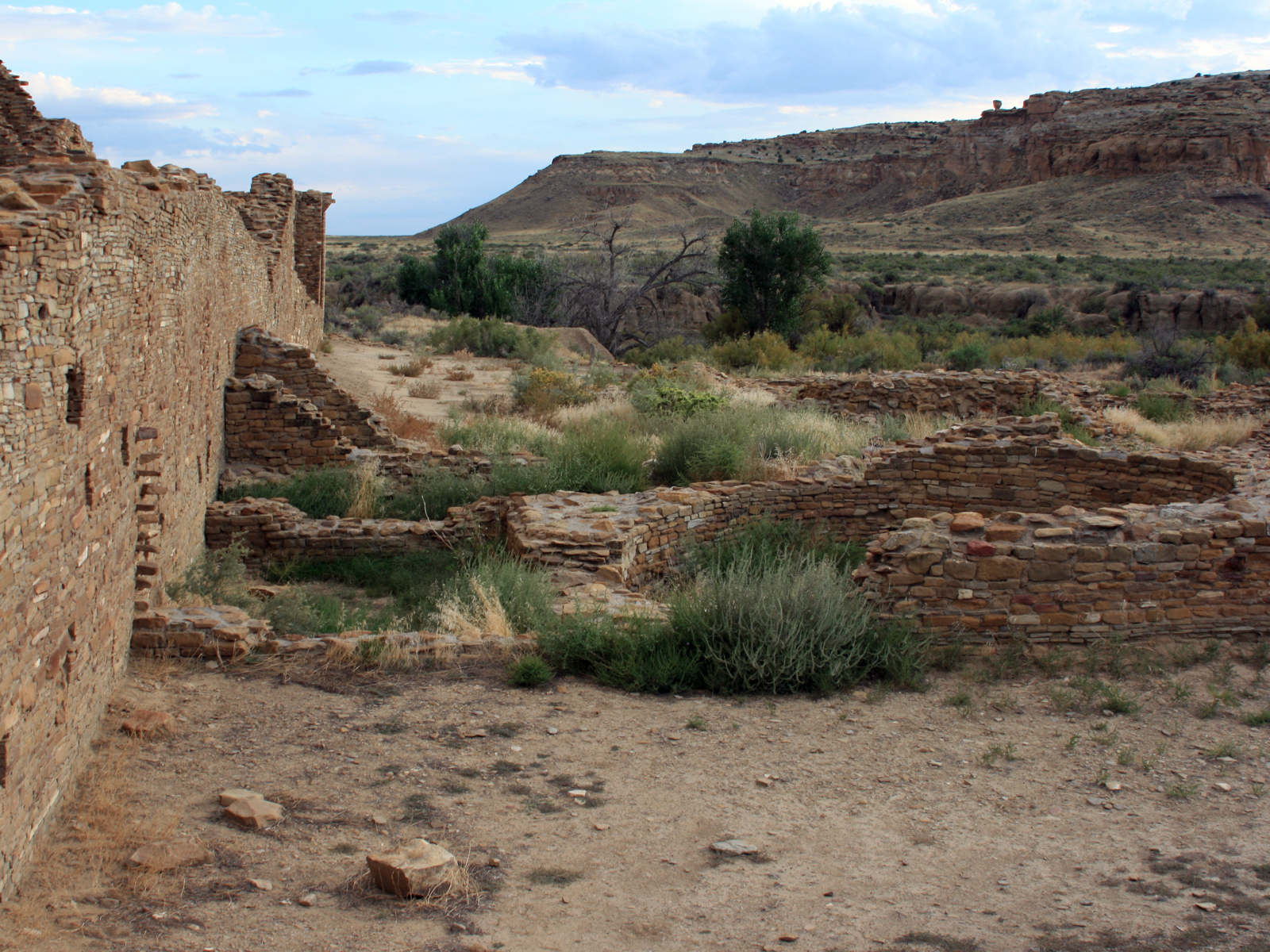
Casa Rinconada

Some parties have advanced the theory that at least 12 of the 14 principal Chacoan complexes were sited and aligned in coordination, and that each was oriented along axes that mirrored the passing of the Sun and Moon at visually pivotal times. The first great house known to evince fastidious proportioning and alignment was Casa Rinconada: the twinned T-shaped portals of its 10 m (33 ft) radius great kiva were north–south collinear, and axes joining opposing windows passed within 10 cm (4 in) of its center. The great houses of Pueblo Bonito and Chetro Ketl were found by the "Solstice Project" and the U.S. National Geodetic Survey to be sited along a precisely east–west line, an axis that captures the passage of the equinox sun. The lines perpendicularly bisecting their principal walls are aligned north–south, implying a possible intent to mirror the equinox midday. Pueblo Alto and Tsin Kletsin are also north–south aligned. These two axes form an inverted cross when viewed from above; its northbound reach is extended another 35 mi (56 km) past Pueblo Alto by the ramrod-straight Great North Road, a pilgrimage route that modern-day Pueblo Indians believe to be an allusion to myths surrounding their arrival from the distant north.

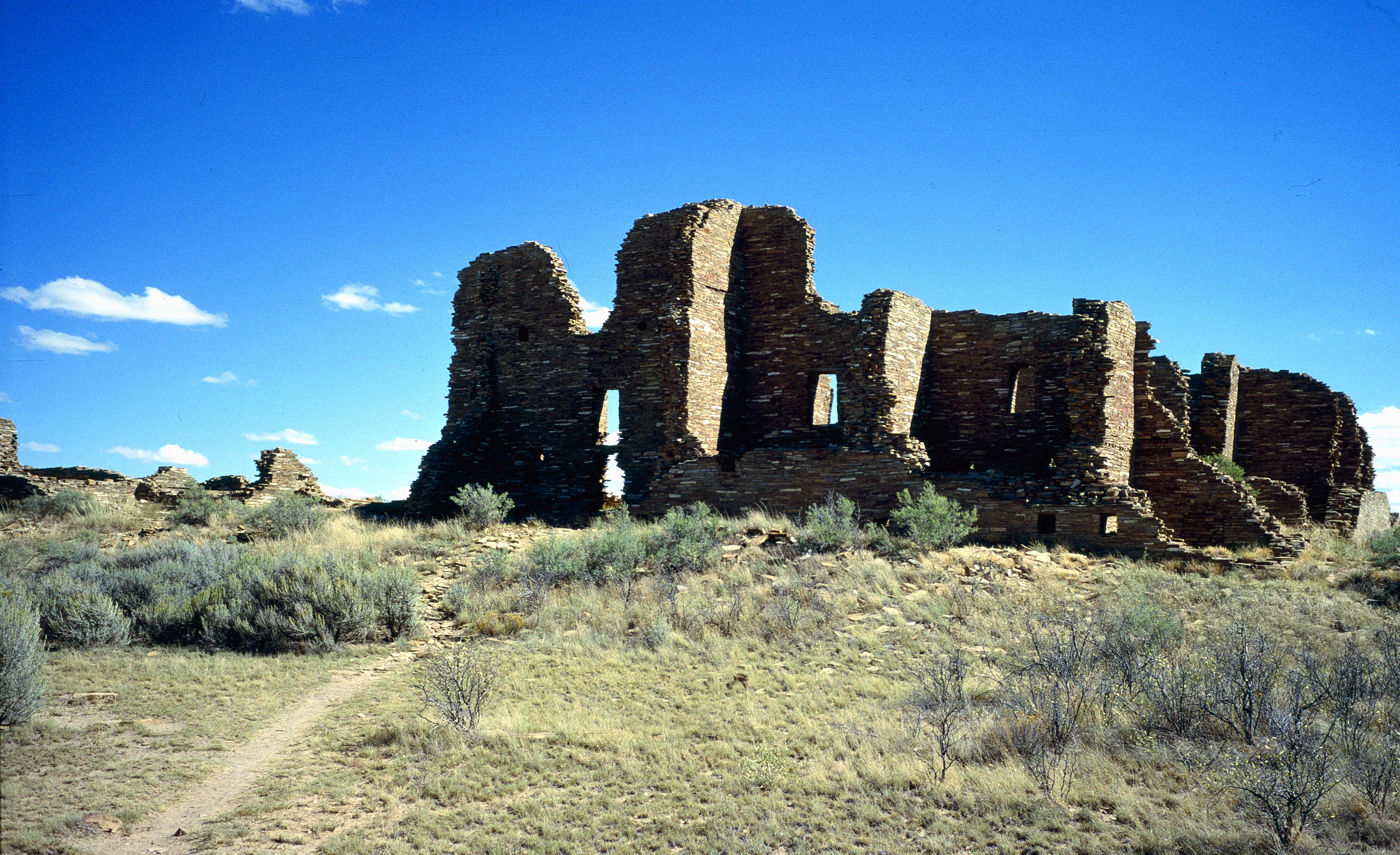
Pueblo Pintado, an outlying Chacoan great house

Two shared-latitude but diametrically opposed complexes, Pueblo Pintado and Kin Bineola, are located some 15 mi (24 km) from the core buildings of the central canyon. Each lies on a path from the central canyon that is collinear with the passage and setting of the full mid-winter "minimum moon", which recurs every 18.6 years. Two other complexes that are less distant from Pueblo Bonito, Una Vida and Peñasco Blanco, share an axis collinear with the passage of the full "maximum moon". The terms "minimum" and "maximum" refer to the azimuthal extreme points in the lunar excursion cycle, or the swings in direction relative to true north that the setting full moon exhibits. It takes roughly 9.25 years for the rising or setting full moon nearest to winter solstice to proceed from its maximum azimuthal north, or maximum extremum, to its southernmost azimuth, or minimum extremum.

Speculation about the reasons for the alignments has been offered:

As these people would view the heavens... there was an order of things up there. What you had here... contrasted to that. Some years it was too dry, too hot... too windy, too cold. If there was a way to transfer the orderly nature of the cosmos down onto what seems to be chaos that exists here, then you begin to then integrate at this place both heaven and earth. And this would be... the center place.

— Phillip Tuwaletstiwa, U.S. National Geodetic Survey, The Mystery of Chaco Canyon

== Geography ==
Chaco Canyon is in the San Juan Basin, atop the Colorado Plateau, surrounded by the Chuska Mountains to the west, the San Juan Mountains to the north, and the San Pedro Mountains to the east. Ancient Chacoans drew upon dense forests of oak, piñon, ponderosa pine, and juniper for timber and other resources. The canyon itself, located within lowlands circumscribed by dune fields, ridges, and mountains, is aligned along a roughly northwest-to-southeast axis and rimmed by flat massifs known as mesas. Large gaps between the southwestern cliff faces—side canyons known as rincons—were critical in funneling rain-bearing storms into the canyon and boosting local precipitation levels. The principal Chacoan complexes, such as Pueblo Bonito, Nuevo Alto, and Kin Kletso, have elevations of 6,200 to 6,440 ft (1,890 to 1,960 m).

The alluvial canyon floor slopes downward to the northwest at a gentle grade of 30 feet per mile (6 m/km); it is bisected by the Chaco Wash, an arroyo that rarely has water. The canyon's main aquifers were too deep to be of use to ancient Chacoans: only several smaller and shallower sources supported the small springs that sustained them. Today, aside from occasional storm runoff coursing through arroyos, substantial surface water—springs, pools, wells—is virtually nonexistent.

== Geology ==
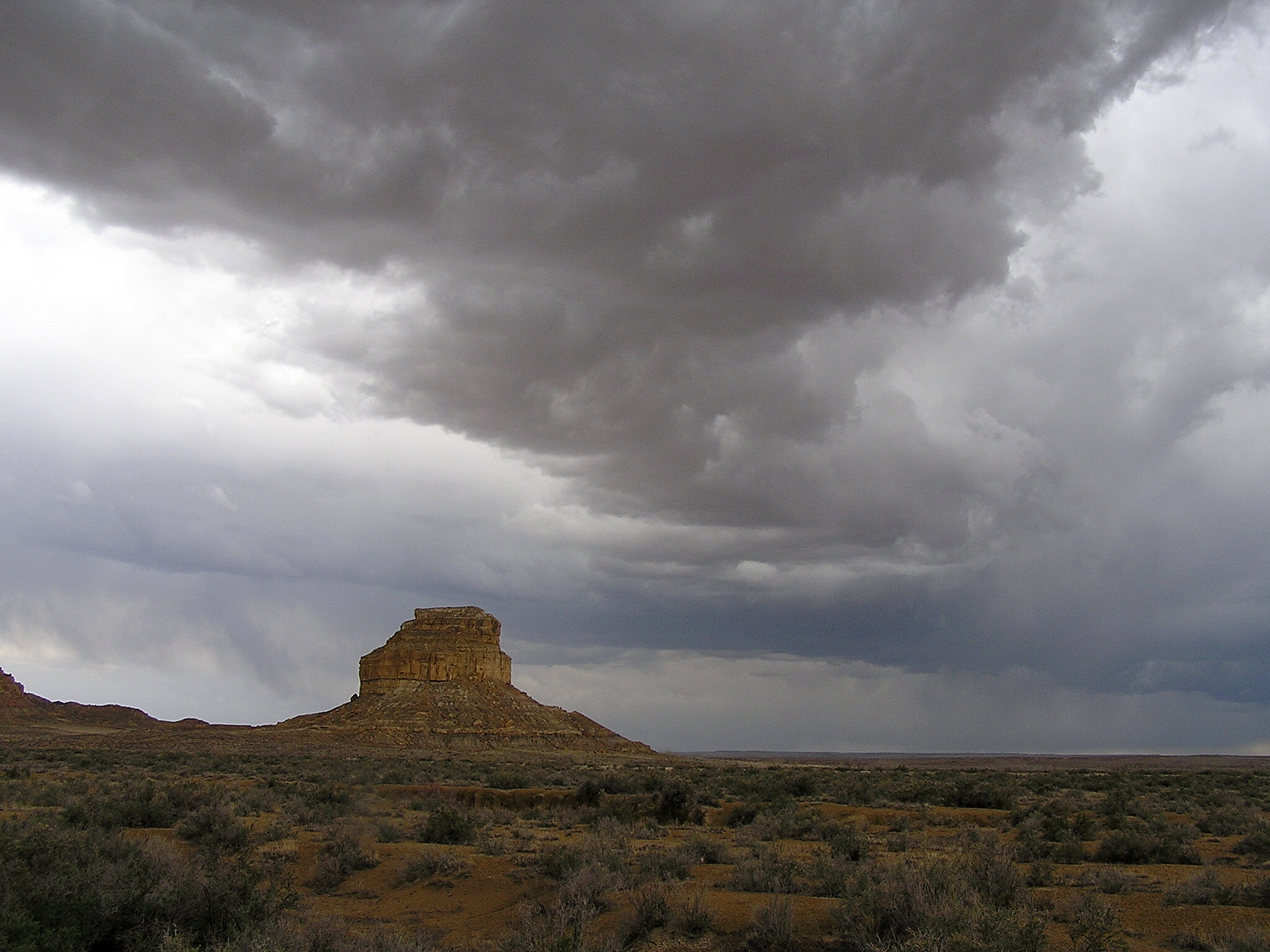
Summer thunderstorms over Fajada Butte and the Fajada Gap, near the southwestern rim of Chaco Canyon

After the Pangaean supercontinent sundered during the Cretaceous period, the region became part of a shifting transition zone between a shallow inland sea—the Western Interior Seaway—and a band of plains and low hills to the west. A sandy and swampy coastline oscillated east and west, alternately submerging and uncovering the area atop the present Colorado Plateau that Chaco Canyon now occupies.

The Chaco Wash flowed across the upper strata of what is now the 400-foot (120 m) Chacra Mesa, cutting into it and gouging out a broad canyon over millions of years. The mesa comprises sandstone and shale formations dating to the Late Cretaceous, which are of the Mesaverde Group. The canyon bottomlands were further eroded, exposing Menefee Shale bedrock; this was later buried under roughly 125 ft (38 m) of sediment. The canyon and mesa lie within the "Chaco Core", which is distinct from the wider Chaco Plateau, a flat region of grassland with infrequent stands of timber. As the Continental Divide is only 15.5 miles (25 km) east of the canyon, geological characteristics and different patterns of drainage differentiate these regions both from each other and from the nearby Chaco Slope, the Gobernador Slope, and the Chuska Valley.

== Climate ==
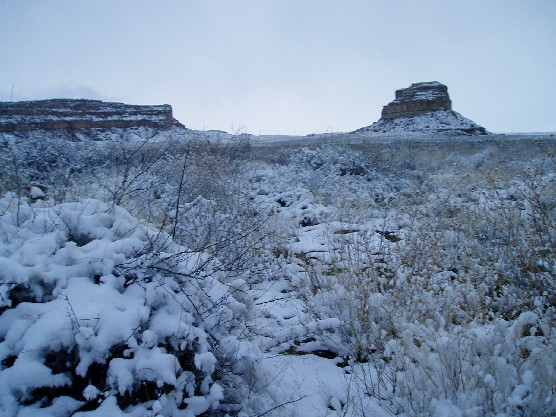
Fajada Butte: Chaco averages three or four snowstorms a winter.

An arid region of high xeric scrubland and desert steppe, the canyon and wider basin average 8 in (200 mm) of rainfall annually; the park averages 9.1 in (230 mm). Chaco Canyon is on the leeward side of extensive mountain ranges to the south and west, resulting in a rainshadow effect that fosters the prevailing lack of moisture. The region has four distinct seasons. Rainfall is likeliest from July to September, while May and June are the driest months. Orographic precipitation, which results from moisture wrung out of storm systems ascending the mountain ranges around Chaco Canyon, is responsible for most of the summer and winter precipitation, and rainfall increases with elevation.

Chaco has remarkable climatic extremes: temperatures range between −38 and 102 °F (−39 and 39 °C), and may swing 60 °F (33 °C) in a single day. The region averages fewer than 150 frost-free days per year, and the local climate swings wildly from years of plentiful rainfall to prolonged drought. The heavy influence of the El Niño–Southern Oscillation contributes to the fickle climate.

Climate data for Chaco Culture National Historical Park, New Mexico, 1991–2020 normals, extremes 1912–2022
Month	Jan	Feb	Mar	Apr	May	Jun	Jul	Aug	Sep	Oct	Nov	Dec	Year
Record high °F (°C)	70 (21)	72 (22)	87 (31)	86 (30)	97 (36)	103 (39)	106 (41)	102 (39)	102 (39)	98 (37)	79 (26)	74 (23)	106 (41)
Mean daily maximum °F (°C)	42.9 (6.1)	48.7 (9.3)	58.4 (14.7)	66.1 (18.9)	75.7 (24.3)	86.7 (30.4)	89.7 (32.1)	86.7 (30.4)	80.0 (26.7)	67.8 (19.9)	54.6 (12.6)	43.5 (6.4)	66.7 (19.3)
Daily mean °F (°C)	27.9 (−2.3)	33.4 (0.8)	40.5 (4.7)	47.6 (8.7)	56.5 (13.6)	66.8 (19.3)	72.5 (22.5)	69.8 (21.0)	62.0 (16.7)	49.3 (9.6)	37.3 (2.9)	28.1 (−2.2)	49.3 (9.6)
Mean daily minimum °F (°C)	12.8 (−10.7)	18.1 (−7.7)	22.5 (−5.3)	29.0 (−1.7)	37.3 (2.9)	46.9 (8.3)	55.3 (12.9)	52.9 (11.6)	44.0 (6.7)	30.9 (−0.6)	19.9 (−6.7)	12.8 (−10.7)	31.9 (−0.1)
Record low °F (°C)	−37 (−38)	−26 (−32)	−17 (−27)	1 (−17)	10 (−12)	25 (−4)	33 (1)	28 (−2)	19 (−7)	2 (−17)	−35 (−37)	−38 (−39)	−38 (−39)
Average precipitation inches (mm)	0.53 (13)	0.58 (15)	0.45 (11)	0.51 (13)	0.55 (14)	0.41 (10)	1.43 (36)	1.31 (33)	1.14 (29)	0.71 (18)	0.60 (15)	0.71 (18)	8.93 (225)
Average snowfall inches (cm)	2.7 (6.9)	2.7 (6.9)	1.3 (3.3)	0.7 (1.8)	0.1 (0.25)	0.0 (0.0)	0.0 (0.0)	0.0 (0.0)	0.0 (0.0)	0.3 (0.76)	1.6 (4.1)	1.8 (4.6)	11.2 (28.61)
Average precipitation days (≥ 0.01 in)	4.2	4.5	3.6	3.6	4.3	2.9	8.4	8.6	6.0	5.1	3.8	4.8	59.8
Average snowy days (≥ 0.1 in)	2.4	1.5	1.0	0.4	0.0	0.0	0.0	0.0	0.0	0.1	0.8	2.3	8.5
Source 1: NOAA
Source 2: xmACIS2

== Flora and fauna ==
Chacoan flora typifies that of North American high deserts: sagebrush and several species of cactus are interspersed with dry scrub forests of piñon and juniper, the latter primarily on the mesa tops. The canyon is far drier than other parts of New Mexico located at similar latitudes and elevations, and it lacks the temperate coniferous forests plentiful to the east. The prevailing sparseness of plants and wildlife was echoed in ancient times, when overpopulation, expanding cultivation, overhunting, habitat destruction, and drought may have led the Chacoans to strip the canyon of wild plants and game. It has been suggested that even during wet periods the canyon was able to sustain only 2,000 people.

Among Chacoan mammals are the plentiful coyote (Canis latrans); mule deer, elk, and pronghorn also live within the canyon, although they are rarely encountered by visitors. Important smaller carnivores include bobcats, badgers, foxes, and two species of skunk. The park hosts abundant populations of rodents, including several prairie dog towns. Small colonies of bats are present during the summer. The local shortage of water means that relatively few bird species are present; these include roadrunners, large hawks (such as Cooper's hawks and American kestrels), owls, vultures, and ravens, although they are less abundant in the canyon than in the wetter mountain ranges to the east. Sizeable populations of smaller birds, including warblers, sparrows, and house finches, are also common. Three species of hummingbirds are present: one is the tiny but highly pugnacious rufous hummingbird, which competes intensely with the more mild-tempered black-chinned hummingbirds for breeding habitat in shrubs or trees located near water. Prairie rattlesnakes are occasionally seen in the backcountry, although skinks and various other lizards are far more abundant.

== Management ==
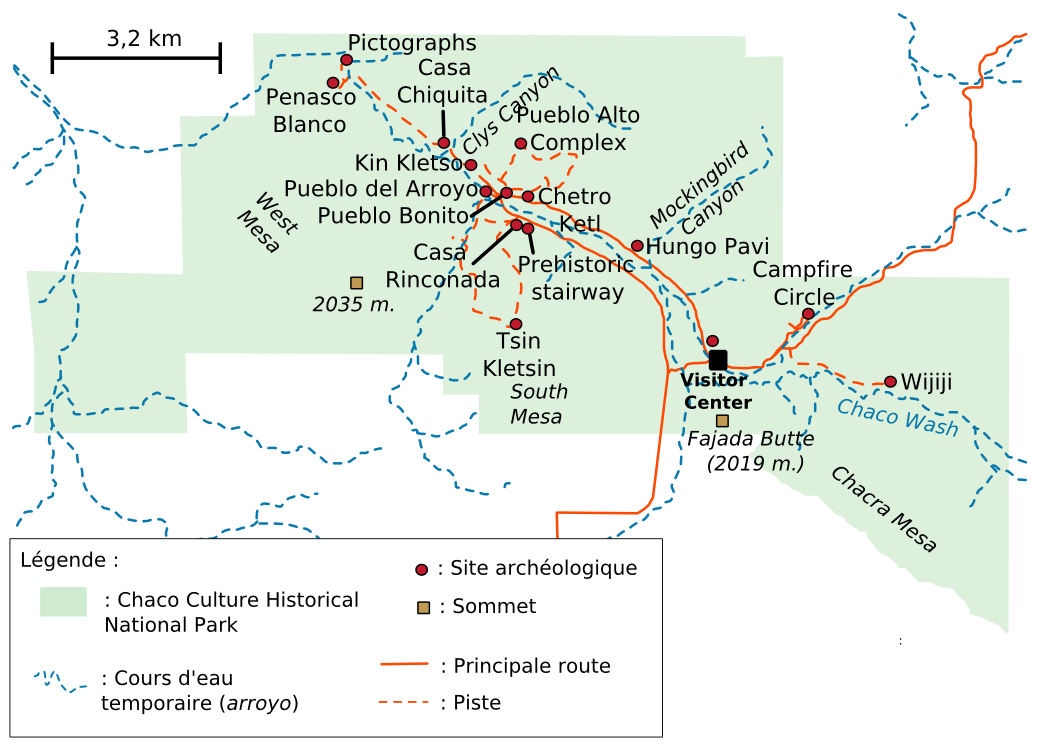
Major Chacoan sites within the park

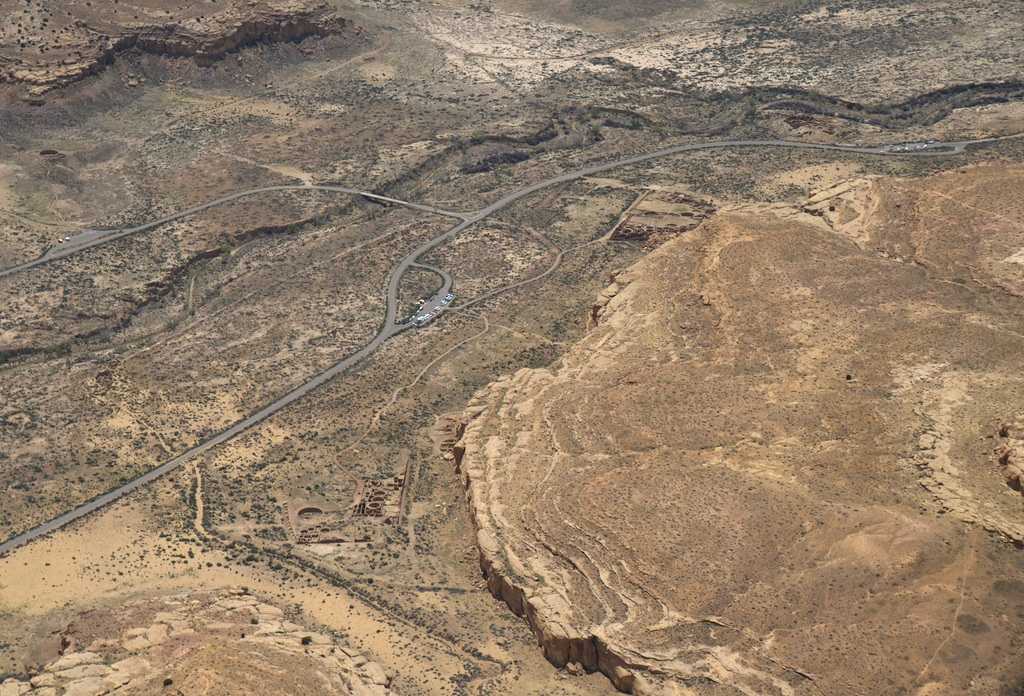
Aerial park overview

Chaco Culture National Historical Park is managed by the National Park Service, a federal agency within the Department of the Interior; neighboring federal lands hosting Chacoan roads are controlled by the Bureau of Land Management. In the 2002–03 fiscal year, the park's total annual operating budget was $1.434 million. The park has a visitor center featuring the "Chaco Collection Museum", an information desk, a theater, a book store, an observatory, and a gift shop. Visits to the Chaco Collection at the Hibben Center on the University of New Mexico Albuquerque campus can be arranged by appointment. Until the 1980s, archeological excavations within current park boundaries were intensive: compound walls were dismantled or demolished, and thousands of artifacts were extracted. Starting in 1981, a new approach, informed by traditional Hopi and Pueblo beliefs, stopped such intrusions. Remote sensing, anthropological study of Indian oral traditions, and dendrochronology—which left Chacoan relics undisturbed—were pursued. In 1991, the "Chaco American Indian Consultation Committee" was established to give Navajo, Hopi, Pueblo, and other Indian representatives a voice in park oversight.

Current park policy mandates partial restoration of excavated sites. "Backfilling", or re-burying excavated sites with sand, is one such means. Other measures attempt to safeguard the area's ancient ambience and mystique, such as the "Chaco Night Sky Program", which seeks to eliminate the effect of light pollution on the park's acclaimed night skies; under the program, some 14,000 visitors make use of the Chaco Observatory (inaugurated in 1998), park telescopes, and astronomy-related programs. The park was named a Gold-tier Dark Sky Park by the International Dark-Sky Association in 2013. Chacoan relics outside the current park's boundaries have been threatened by development: an example was the proposed competitive leasing of federal lands in the San Juan Basin for surface coal mining beginning in 1983. As ample coal deposits abut the park, this strip mining threatened the web of ancient Chacoan roads. The year-long "Chaco Roads Project" thus documented the roads, which were later protected from mining.

As archaeological significance extends beyond the park's boundaries, the United States Department of the Interior intends to withdraw a 10-mile buffer zone around the park from development.

== Gallery ==
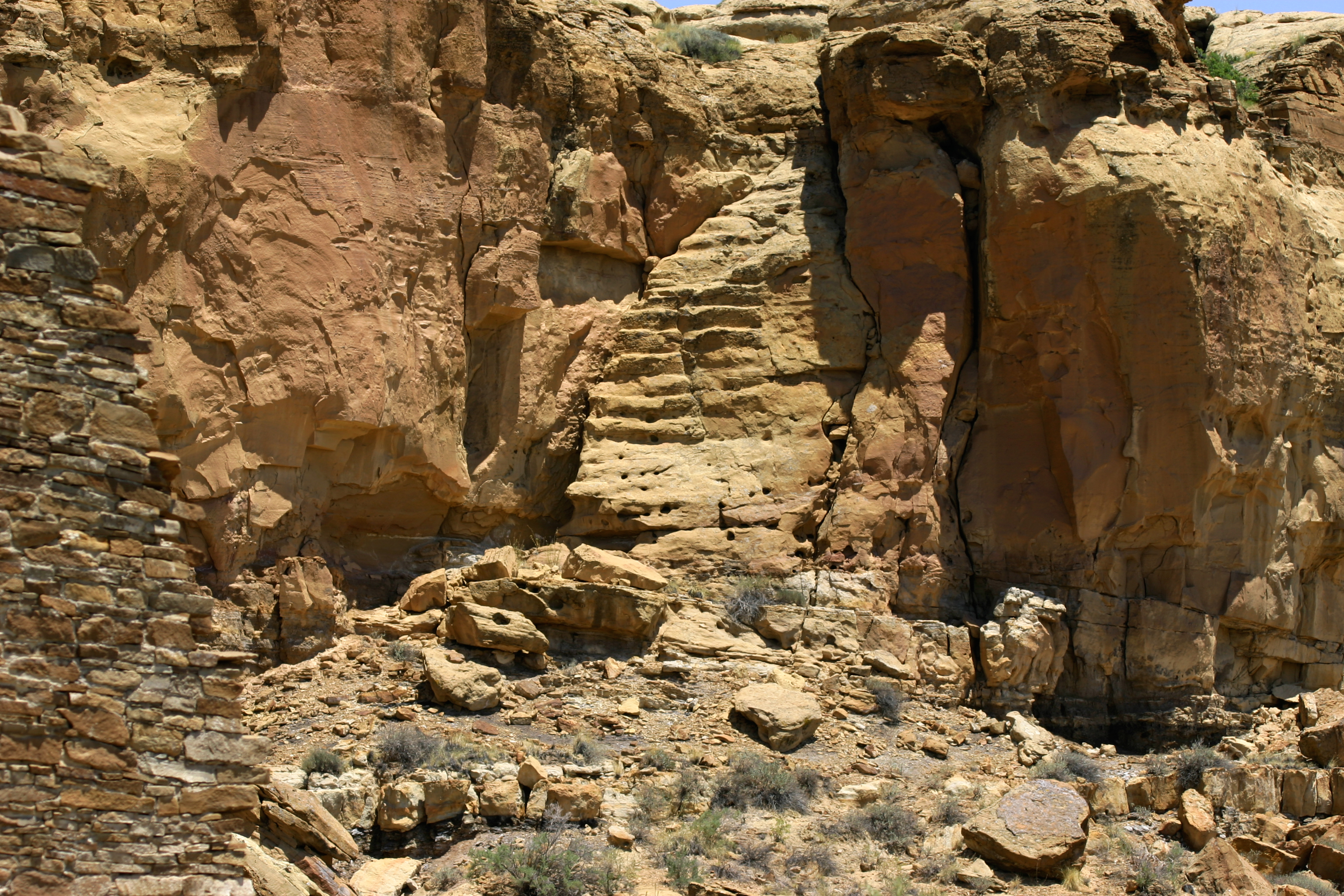
Chaco Prehistoric Stairway, Chaco National Cultural Historic Park, New Mexico

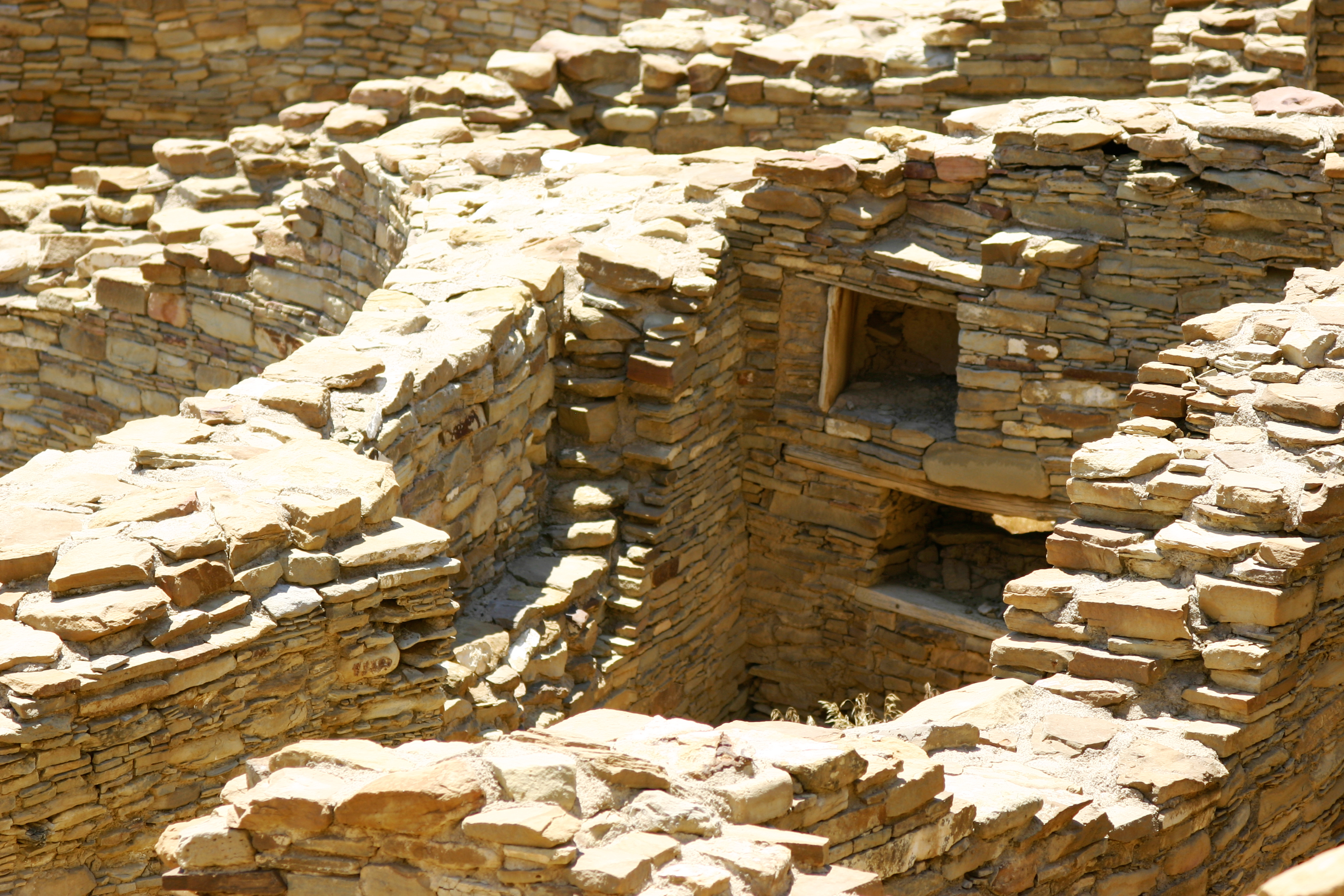
Chaco Kiva Detail, Chaco Culture National Historic Park, New Mexico

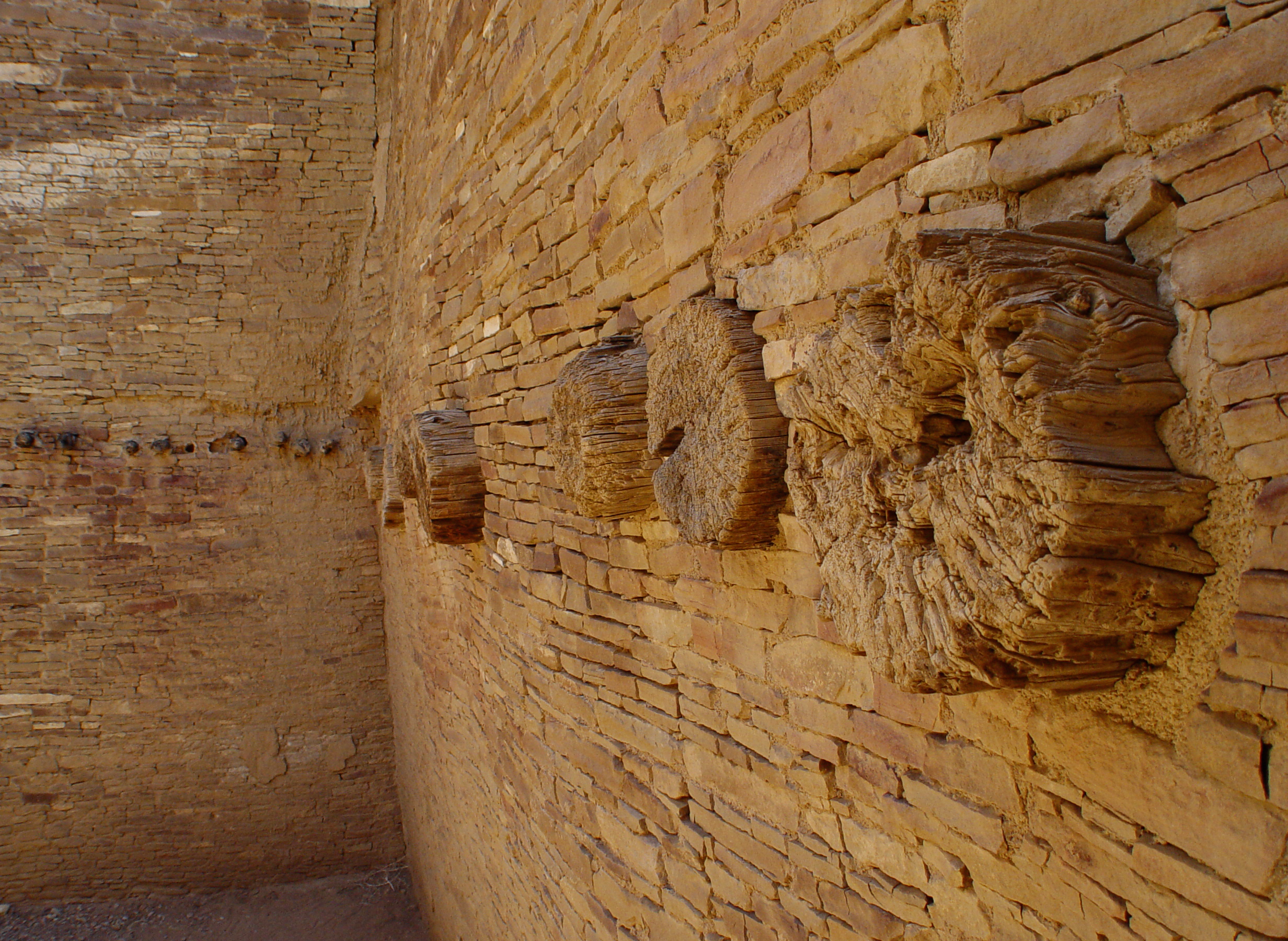
Chaco interior wall, showing log and stone construction, Chaco Cultural Historic Park, New Mexico

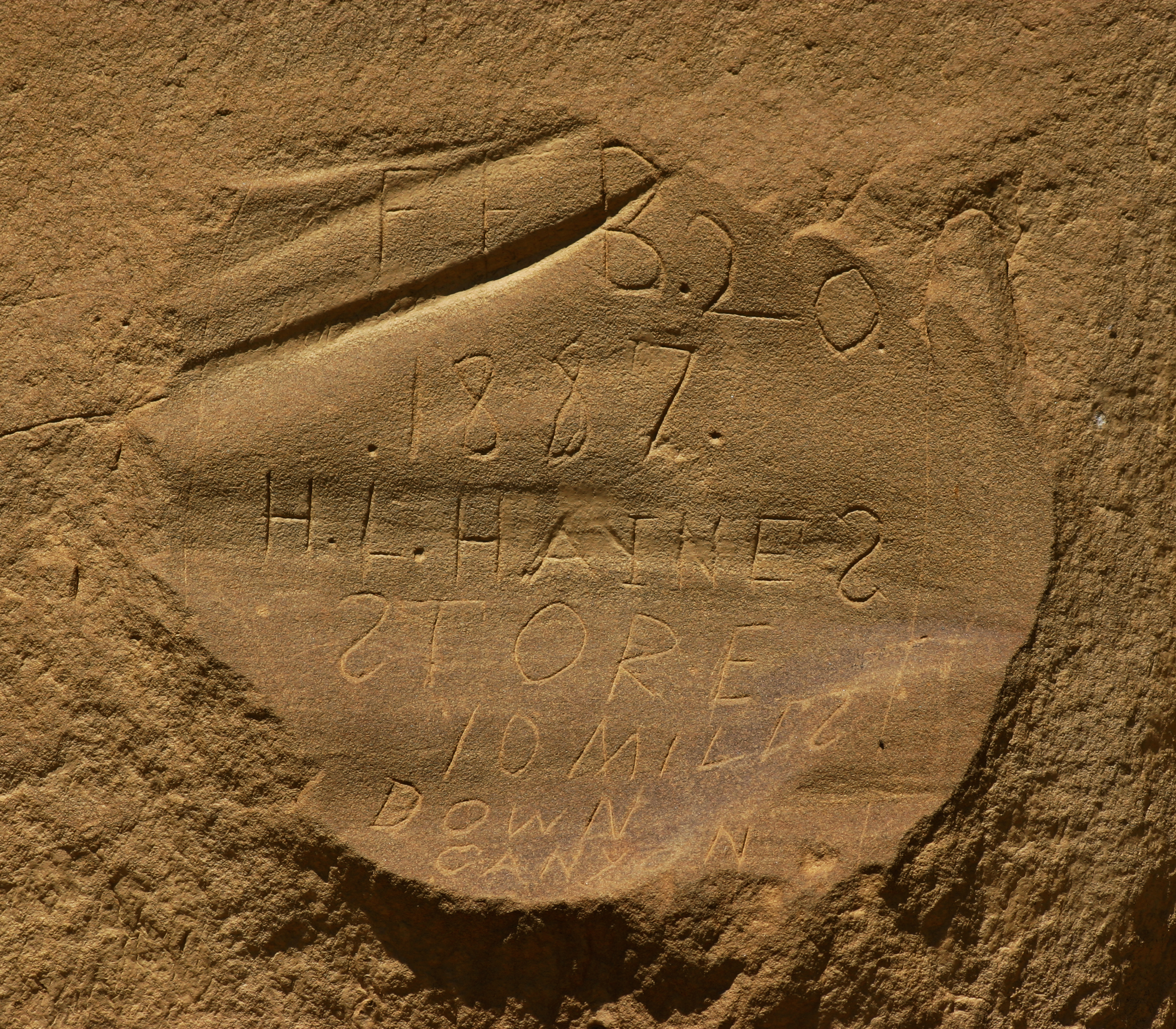
Early Graffiti, Chaco Culture National Historic Park, New Mexico

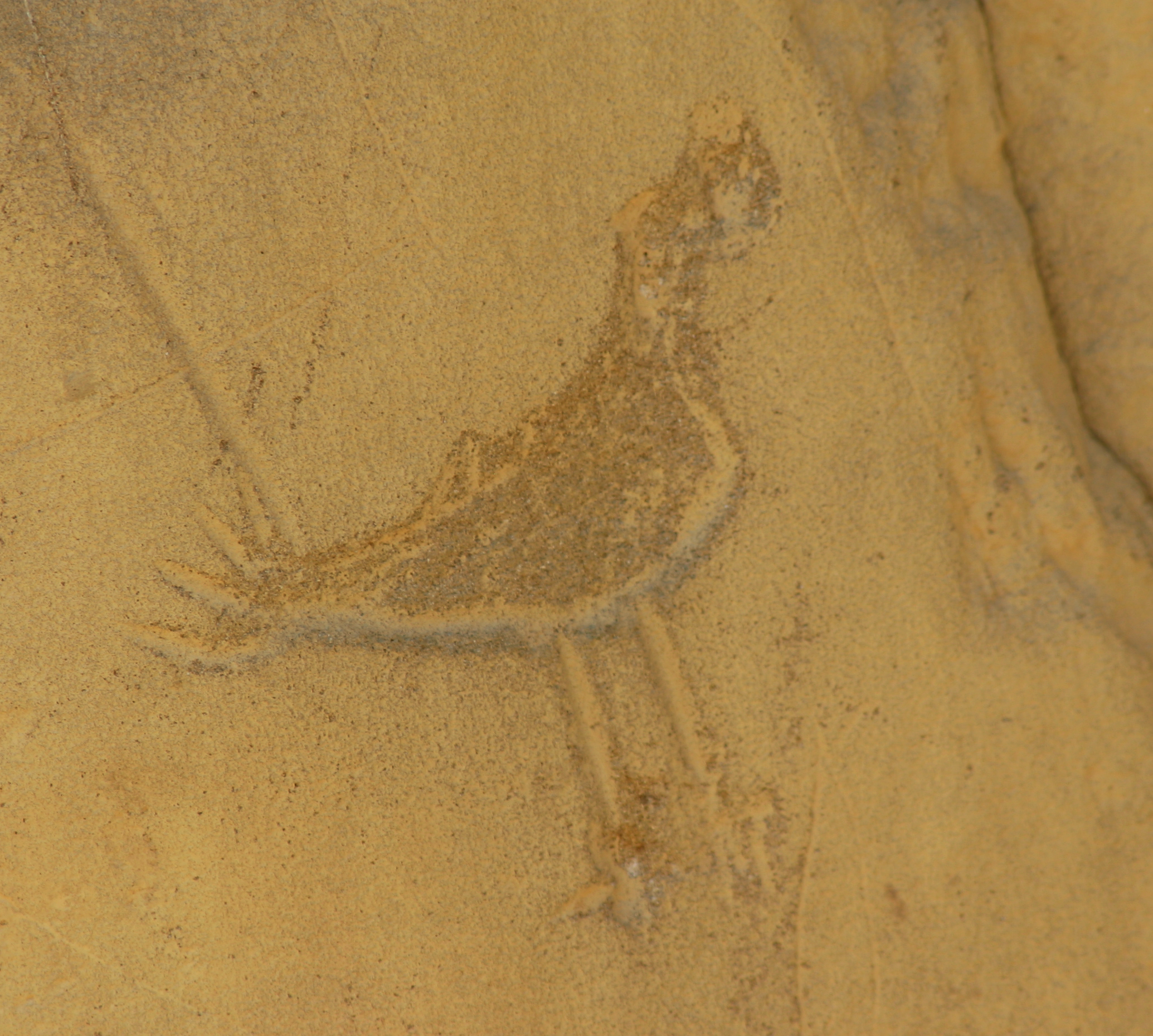
Chaco Pictograph, Chaco Culture Historical Park, New Mexico

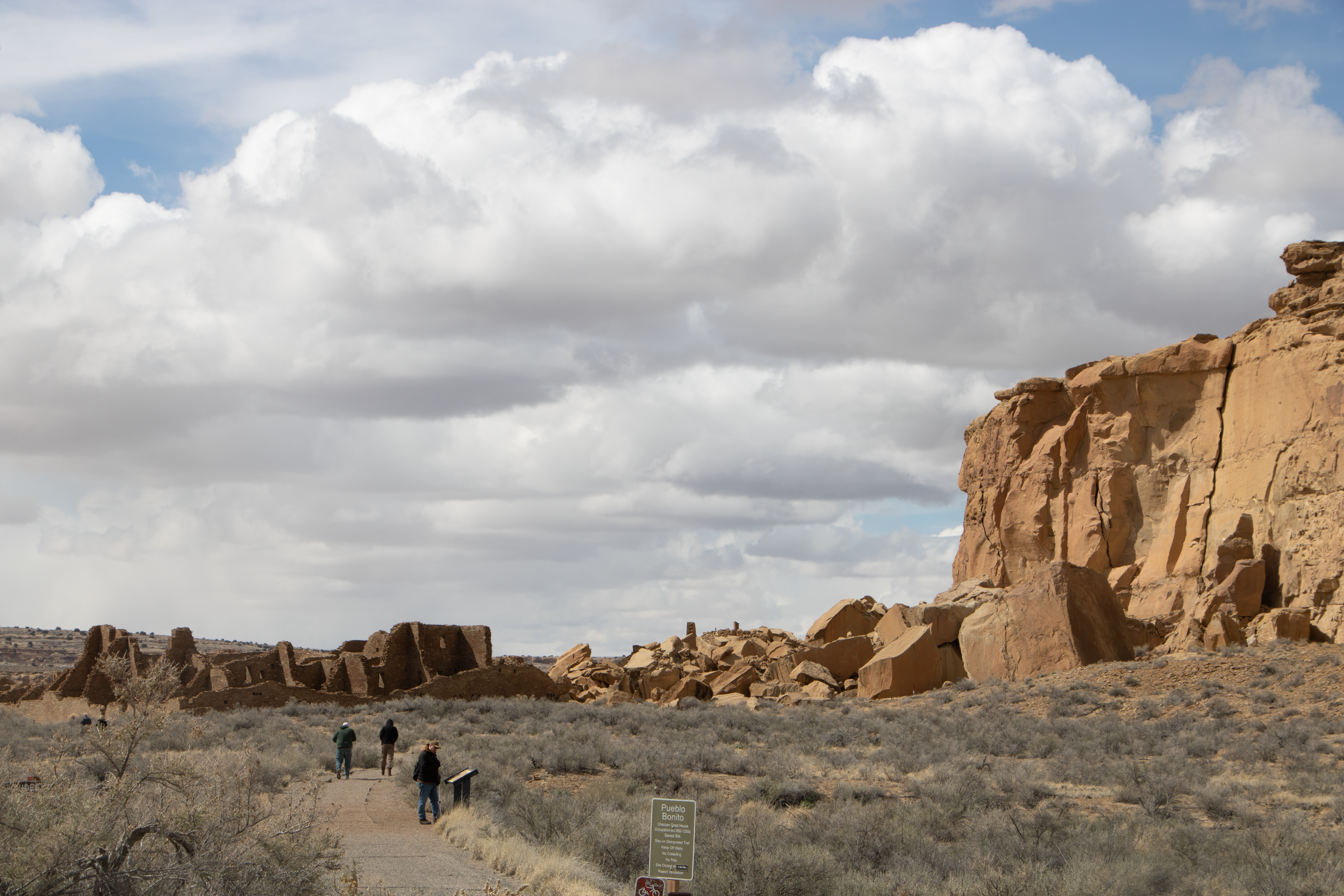
Pueblo Bonito from far away

== See also ==
- Oasisamerica
- Ah-Shi-Sle-Pah Wilderness Study Area
- Bisti/De-Na-Zin Wilderness
- Kasha-Katuwe Tent Rocks National Monument
- Bryce Canyon National Park
- List of archaeoastronomical sites by country
- List of the oldest buildings in New Mexico
- National Register of Historic Places listings in McKinley County, New Mexico

== Bibliography ==
- English, N. B.; Betancourt, J.; Dean, J. S.; Quade, J. (2001), "Strontium isotopes reveal distant sources of architectural timber in Chaco Canyon, New Mexico", Proceedings of the National Academy of Sciences, 98 (21): 11891–96, Bibcode:2001PNAS...9811891E, doi:10.1073/pnas.211305498, PMC 59738, PMID 11572943
- Brugge, D. M.; Hayes, A.; Judge, W. J. (February 1988), Archeological Surveys of Chaco Canyon, New Mexico, University of New Mexico Press, ISBN 978-0826310293
- Diamond, J. (December 29, 2004), Collapse: How Societies Choose to Fail or Succeed (1st ed.), Viking, ISBN 978-0670033379
- Elliott, M. (August 15, 1995), Great Excavations: Tales of Early Southwestern Archaeology, 1888–1939 (1st ed.), School of American Research Press, ISBN 978-0933452435
- Fagan, B. M. (May 1, 2005), Chaco Canyon: Archaeologists Explore the Lives of an Ancient Society, Oxford University Press, ISBN 978-0195170436
- Fagan, B. M. (April 9, 1999), From Black Land to Fifth Sun: The Science of Sacred Sites, Basic Books, ISBN 978-0738201412
- Frazier, K. (2005), People of Chaco: A Canyon and Its Culture, Norton, ISBN 978-0393318258
- Hopkins, R. L. (January 15, 2003), Hiking the Southwest's Geology: Four Corners Region, Mountaineers Books, ISBN 978-0898868562
- Kelley, D. H.; Milone, E. F. (November 19, 2004), Exploring Ancient Skies: An Encyclopedic Survey of Archaeoastronomy (1st ed.), Springer, ISBN 978-0387953106
- LeBlanc, S. A. (February 9, 1999), Prehistoric Warfare in the American Southwest (1st ed.), Salt Lake City: University of Utah Press, ISBN 978-0874805819
- Magli, Giulio (April 28, 2009), Mysteries and Discoveries of Archaeoastronomy: From Giza to Easter Island (1st ed.), Springer, ISBN 978-0-387-76564-8
- Noble, David Grant, ed. (August 1984), New Light on Chaco Canyon (1st ed.), School of American Research Press, ISBN 978-0-933452-10-7
- Noble, David Grant (January 1, 2000), Ancient Ruins of the Southwest: An Archaeological Guide, Cooper Square Publishing, ISBN 978-0-87358-724-2
- Reed, Paul F. (2004). The Puebloan Society of Chaco Canyon. Greenwood Publishing Group. ISBN 978-0-313-32720-9. Archived from the original on April 20, 2014.
- Reynolds, A.; Betancourt, J.; Quade, J.; Patchett, P. J.; Dean, J. S.; Stein, J. (2005), "^{87}Sr/^{86}Sr Sourcing of Ponderosa Pine Used in Anasazi Great House Construction at Chaco Canyon, New Mexico" (PDF), Journal of Archaeological Science, 32 (7): 1061–75, Bibcode:2005JArSc..32.1061R, doi:10.1016/j.jas.2005.01.016, archived from the original (PDF) on March 26, 2009
- Sofaer, A. (1997), The Primary Architecture of the Chacoan Culture: A Cosmological Expression, University of New Mexico Press, archived from the original on July 23, 2009
- Sofaer, A.; Dibble, M. (1999), "The Mystery of Chaco Canyon", The Solstice Project, Bullfrog Films
- Strutin, M. (June 1994), Chaco: A Cultural Legacy, Southwest Parks and Monuments Association, ISBN 978-1877856457, "photography by George H. H. Huey."
- Stuart, D. E. (May 1, 2000), Anasazi America, University of New Mexico Press, ISBN 978-0826321794, "research assistance by Susan Moczygemba-McKinsey."

== Sources ==
- United States World Heritage Periodic Report: Chaco Culture National Historical Park (Section II) (PDF), National Park Service, 2005, archived from the original (PDF) on May 30, 2009
- Chaco Culture National Historical Park, National Park Service, 2007, archived from the original on July 30, 2009
- "Chaco Culture National Historical Park", National Register of Historic Places, Thoreau, New Mexico: National Park Service, October 15, 1966, #148900
