= Atlatl Cave =

Feature at the Chaco Culture National Historical Park, New Mexico

Atlatl Cave is an important archaeological site that contains organic evidence of occupation by Archaic North Americans c. 900 BCE. It is located at the west end of the Chaco Culture National Historical Park in San Juan County, New Mexico, at an elevation of 1910 meters.

== History ==
During the 1970s, archaeologists discovered corn, beans, squash, a yucca fiber sandal, a variety of different kinds of miniature beads made from juniper, basketry, juniperus monoserma and juniperus scopulorum twigs, pseudotsuga menziesii wood fragments, and fabric made from rabbit fur in the cave. The breaths of the Archaic-age maize pollen grains are significantly larger than Puebloan and present maize pollen. They also found part of an atlatl, or spear-thrower, from which the site got its name. Unlike most Archaic sites in the canyon, the shelter protected the organic materials inside, which allowed for accurate radiocarbon dating.
