= Casa Rinconada =

- U.S. Historic district – Contributing property
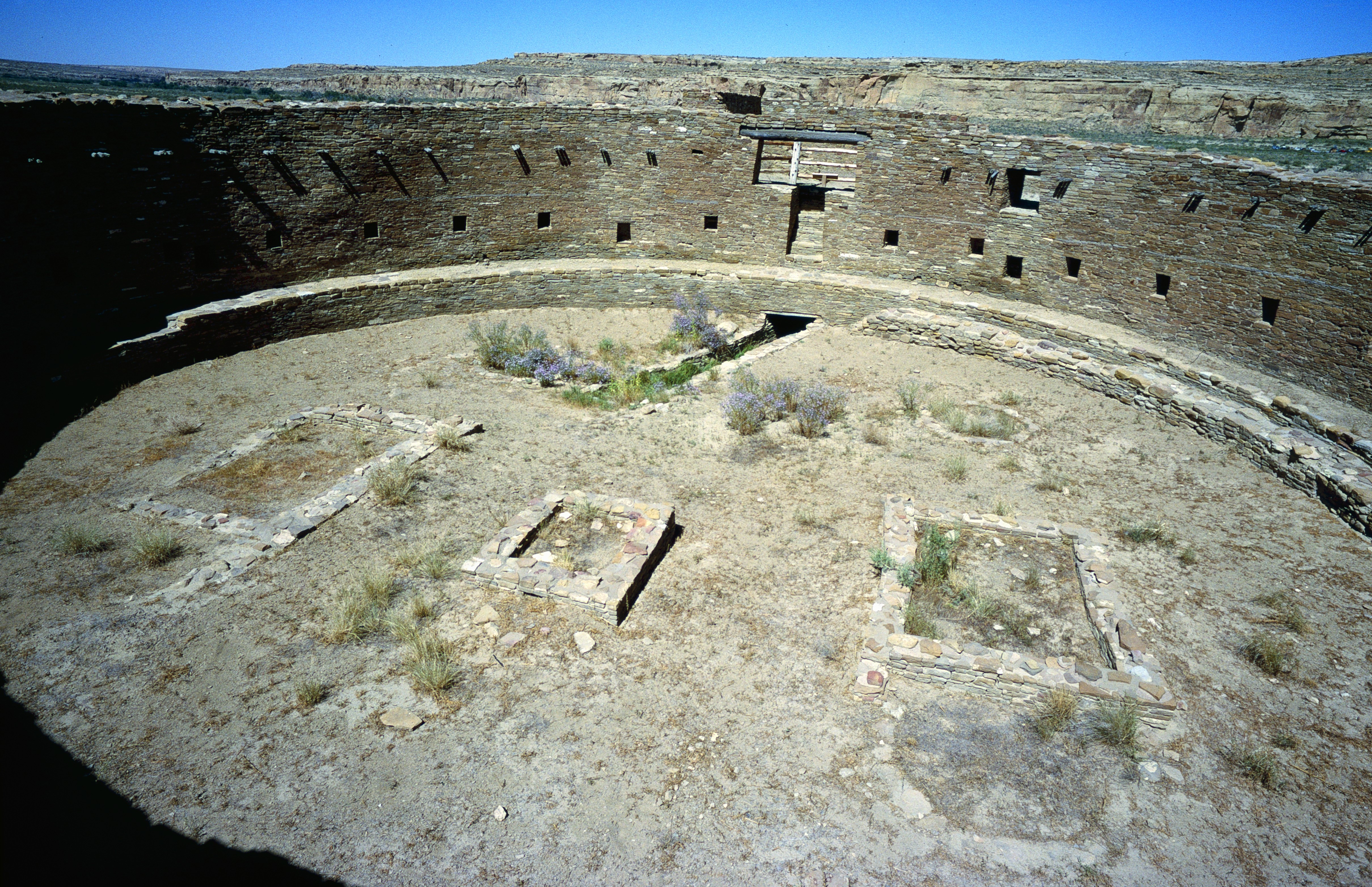
- Casa Rinconada (1998)
- Coordinates: 36°03′17.2″N 107°57′36.9″W
- Part of: Chaco Culture National Historical Park (ID66000895)
- Added to NRHP: October 15, 1966

Casa Rinconada is an Ancestral Puebloan archaeological site located atop a ridge adjacent to a small rincon across from Pueblo Bonito in Chaco Culture National Historical Park, northwestern New Mexico, United States.

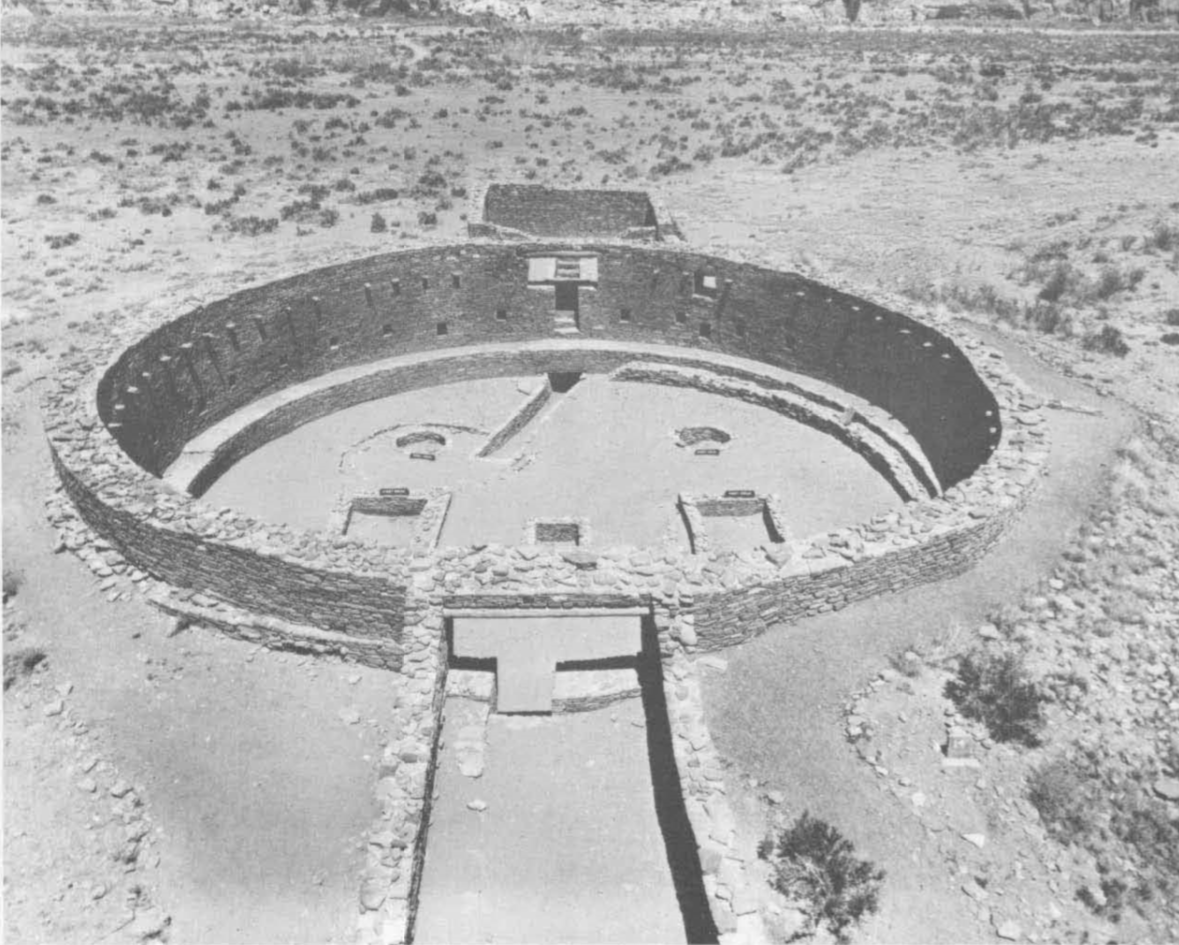
The Ancestral Puebloan great kiva, Casa Rinconada.

It is an isolated great kiva (out of four in Chaco Canyon) with all the typical elements of great kivas: a masonry firebox, an inner bench, four roof-supporting large seating pits, masonry vaults, and 34 niches, divided into two sizes, encircling the kiva. There is also an unusual 39 foot (12 m) long underground passage, perhaps used in the ceremonies to allow performers sudden entry thus surprising the audience. It was dug out of the sandstone and shale that compose the ridge on which the kiva sits.

Casa Rinconada was excavated in 1930–31 by archaeologists Vivian and Reiter and the University of New Mexico/School of American Research field schools. It was reconstructed in part by Vivian in 1933, while Richter of the National Park Service worked on capping outer walls in 1955.

Casa Rinconada is accessible through the Canyon Loop Drive and 1/2-mile (800 m) trail (round trip) off the Drive.

With a diameter of 64 feet (20 m), Casa Rinconada is the largest excavated great kiva in Chaco Canyon.
