= Chaco Wash =

Arroyo in the Chaco Canyon, New Mexico

Coordinates: 36°3′29.0″N 107°57′39.7″W

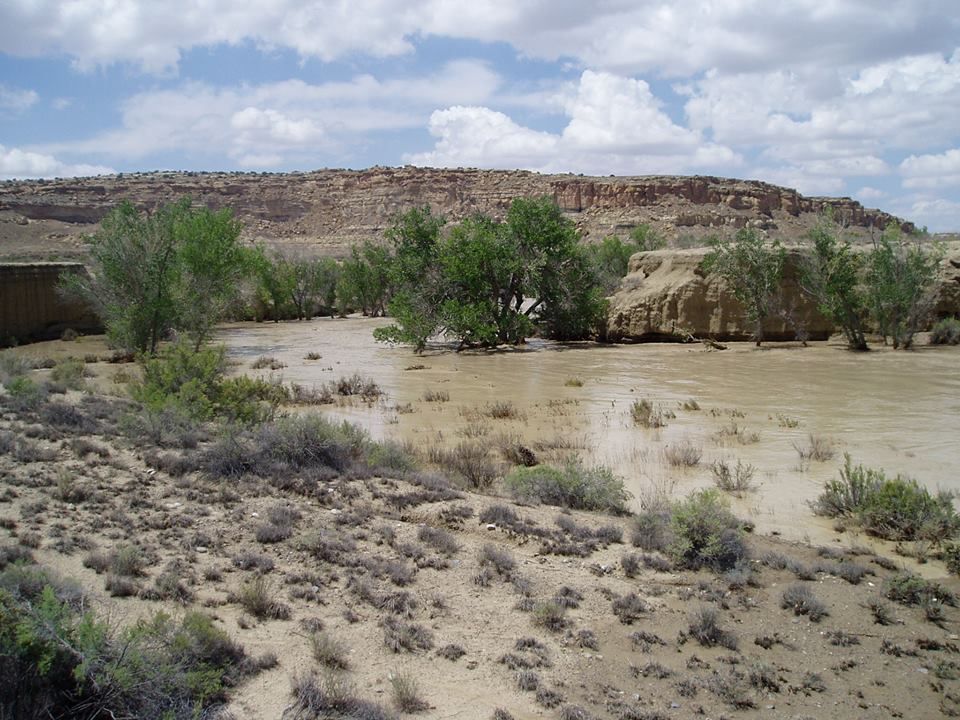
Chaco Wash

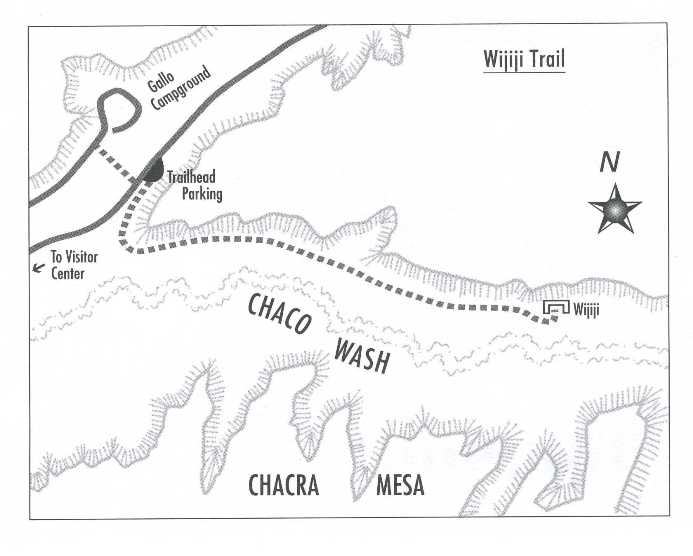
Wijiji Trail

The Chaco Wash is an arroyo (a periodic stream) cutting through Chaco Canyon, which is located in northwestern New Mexico on the Colorado Plateau. Another arroyo known as Escavada Wash is a tributary that feeds in from the northeast, near the western end of Chaco Canyon. Chaco Wash flows northwest to become the intermittent Chaco River. It is a tributary of the San Juan River.

== Bibliography ==
- Fagan, Brian (2005). Chaco Canyon: Archaeologists Explore the Lives of an Ancient Society. Oxford University Press. ISBN 978-0-19-517043-6.
