= Timeline of Chacoan history =

Chronology of Chacoan history

A timeline of Chacoan history includes Chaco Culture National Historical Park, Aztec Ruins National Monument, Twin Angels Pueblo, Casamero Pueblo, Kin Nizhoni, Pierre's Site, and Halfway House.

== Paleo-Indian Period ==
11000 BC
First foragers?

== Archaic Period ==
6000 BC-800 BC
Hunter-gatherers

== 5th century ==
490
Basketmaker farming begins

== 6th century ==
500
Turquoise beads and pendants appear; offerings in great kivas (sites 29SJ423, Shabik' eshchee Village)

== 7th century ==
600-800
La Plata Black-on-White ceramic
700
Population of Chaco Canyon between 100 and 201 people

== 9th century ==
800-900
Builders use piñon, juniper, and cottonwood trees that grew close by

850-925
Large construction projects.

875-1040
Red Mesa Black-on-White ceramics

== 10th century ==
900-1150
Large buildings, mounds, roadways, great kivas, and tri-walled structures are built throughout the San Juan Basin.

900-1125
Construction of Penasco Blanco

900
Emergence of the Chaco Anasazi

900
Chetro Ketl pueblo begun

900-1025
Chaco Wash in erosional cycle and cut a paleo-channel.

925-1130
Stable environmental conditions favorable to dry farming throughout the Colorado Plateau. Human populations also stable.

950
Keet Seel, second largest cliff dwelling. is inhabited
950
Nonlocal ponderosa is the dominant beam timber; spruce and fir increase

== 11th century ==
960-1020
Unpredictable rainfall. Little building at Pueblo Bonito

1000
"Chaco phenomenon" acceleration of cultural development

1000-1075
Great House construction, and roads expanded. The first usage of chocolate further than central Mexico was first used in ceramic cylinders for rituals.

1000-1140
Escavada Black-on-White ceramics

1025-1090
Depositional period during which time the paleo-channel was filling. There is some historical, anecdotal evidence that the inhabitants of Chaco Canyon may have constructed a dam at the west end of the canyon.

1030
Chacoans seek trees at higher altitudes

1040
Increased rainfall

1040-1050
Building resumes at Old Bonito. Pueblo Bonito construction stage II

1050-1070
Pueblo Bonito becomes more complex. Pueblo Bonito construction stage III

1050
Imports of copper bells, Macaws, and shells (origin unknown)

1054
~July 4 - Cliff painting near Penasco Blanco consisting of three symbols: a large star, a crescent moon, and a handprint, may portray the sighting of SN 1054, the Crab Nebula supernova.

1064, 1066
Sunset Crater volcanic eruptions; volcanic debris blankets Jemez Mountains and Bandelier area.

1080-1100
Great North Road construction.

1080
Salmon Ruin established.

1080
Construction of Pueblo Alto begins.

1090
Drought

== 12th century ==
1075-1123
Pueblo Bonito constructed at Chaco.

?
Five astronomical observatories are built

1100
Peak of Chaco culture.

1100-1104
Tree felling at Pueblo del Arroyo

1106-1125
Aztec Ruins built.

1130
Pueblo Bonito is four stories tall and contains 800 rooms

1130-1180
Fifty-year drought in the Southwest. Rain and snow cease to fall. Alluvial groundwater declines, floodplain erosion occurs. Dry-farming zone reduced, crop production potential decreased. Severe arroyo cutting and depression of alluvial groundwater. Severe environmental stress.

1140–1150
Collapse of the Ancestral Puebloan culture at Chaco Canyon.

1150
Great Houses empty

1180
Sunset Crater erupts for the second time.

== 16th century ==
1539
Marcos de Niza erroneously describes the pueblo of Háwikuh as the Seven Cities of Gold.

== 17th century ==
1680-1692
The Pueblo Revolt of the Pueblo people against Spanish colonists in the New Spain province.

1774
Don Bernardo de Miera y Pacheco identifies the Chaco Canyon area as "Chaca" on a map. The term, a Spanish translation of a Navajo word, is thought to be the origin for "Chacra Mesa" and "Chaco".

== 19th century ==
1844
Josiah Gregg refers to the Chaco pueblos in his book Commerce of the Prairies, making its first appearance in popular culture.

1849
Lt. James H. Simpson leads the Washington Expedition, a military reconnaissance team which surveys Navajo lands and records cultural sites in Chaco Canyon. Illustrations created by the Kern brothers are included in a government report.

1877
Artist and photographer William Henry Jackson participates in the Hayden Survey of the Western United States, producing maps of Chaco Canyon, but no photographs due to technical problems.

1888
Richard Wetherill and Charlie Mason find the Cliff Palace, Spruce Tree House and Square Tower House.
Chaco Canyon is surveyed and photographed by Victor and Cosmos Mindeleff of the Bureau of American Ethnology

1896
Richard Wetherill begins excavating Chaco Canyon

1896-1899
George H. Pepper from the American Museum of Natural History leads the Hyde Exploring Expedition in excavating Pueblo Bonito

== 20th century ==
1901
General Land Office special agent S. J. Holsinger recommends creating a national park to preserve archaeological sites in Chaco Canyon

1907
Chaco Canyon National Monument is established.

1928-1929
American astronomer and University of Arizona professor A. E. Douglass participates in a National Geographic Society research project exploring Chaco Canyon. Using his newly invented technique of dendrochronology, Douglass dates Chetro Ketl and dozens of Chacoan sites

Expedition under Neil Merton Judd to collect dendrochronological specimens to date habitation of Chaco Canyon

1937
A Civilian Conservation Corps of Navajo stonemasons repairs Chacoan buildings in Chaco Canyon. A previous group built soil conservation devices, planted trees, and improved roads and trails.

1941
Heavy rains cause Threatening Rock to fall, destroying ~60 rooms at Pueblo Bonito.

1960
Floors excavated at Una Vida

1971-1982
The Chaco Project, conducted by the National Park Service and the University of New Mexico, surveys and excavates Chaco Canyon

1976-1978
Fourteen rooms at Pueblo Alto excavated by the Chaco Project

1980
Chaco Canyon National Monument is renamed Chaco Culture National Historical Park with 13,000 acres (53 km^{2}) added. The Chaco Culture Archaeological Protection Site program is created to protect Chacoan sites.

1982
NASA's Thermal Infrared Multispectral Scanner (TIMS) detects over 200 miles of a prehistoric (AD 900 or 1000) road system in Chaco Canyon, as well as walls, buildings, and agricultural fields.

1983
Dean and Warren estimate 200,000 trees were used to build great houses.

1987
Chaco Culture National Historical Park is designated a UNESCO World Heritage Site.

== 21st century ==
2001
Two-thirds of large roof timbers traced to Chuska Mountains and one-third to San Mateo Mountains.
