= Marietta Palmer Wetherill =

American anthropologist and rancher (1876–1954)

Marietta Palmer Wetherill (October 5, 1876 – July 11, 1954) was an American amateur anthropologist and rancher. She studied the lives, traditions, and customs of the Navajo peoples. She was the wife of Richard Wetherill, who has received credit for "discovering" ancient sites associated with the Anasazi peoples. Marietta was the mother of seven children, four of whom survived to adulthood.

== Early life and marriage ==
Marietta Palmer was born on October 5, 1876, in Serena, Illinois. Her father, Sidney LaVerne Palmer, was a musician who spent time playing for John Philip Sousa. Her mother, Elizabeth Ann Hoag, attended the New England Conservatory of Music, where she met Sidney Palmer. Marietta, her parents, and her brother and sister were all musical. She sang soprano and was proficient with stringed instruments and brass instruments, particularly enjoying the guitar and the harp. She also played the piano and the organ. Marietta received some formal education at the Chicago School for Dramatic Art. Marietta's father had a traveling wagon made for the family. Using this wagon, Marietta, her mother, father, and siblings would periodically travel throughout the American West, playing music for both white and Native audiences. Marietta characterized her childhood as one of curiosity and wonder, with a particular affinity for exploring the outdoors and learning about “the Indians.” Her father had a similar fascination with Native artifacts and frequently hired guides to assist the family in their explorations and excavations during their travels.

Marietta Palmer met Richard Wetherill, a rancher, guide, and amateur archaeologist, in the fall of 1895, when she stayed at his parents’ ranch near Mesa Verde. Sidney Palmer had hired Wetherill while the Palmers were attempting to see the Mesa Verde ruins. In April 1896, Richard Wetherill proposed. He and Marietta married on December 12, 1896, in Sacramento, California. They spent their honeymoon on an excavation venture in Grand Gulch, an ancestral Puebloan land in Utah. Historians guess she may have been the first woman to make this journey. This experience began Marietta's life of accompanying Richard on his archaeological expeditions and diligently recording their findings.

== Life in the American West ==
In 1897, Marietta and Richard moved to the Chaco Canyon in New Mexico. The couple continued excavating and collecting, and donated their findings to the American Museum of Natural History. Richard primarily searched for Native remains, and Marietta accompanied him on many of his ventures, often cooking meals for the excavation team. However, she was more interested in the traditions and daily lives of the living Navajo than searching for the graves of ancient peoples. She spoke the Navajo language fluently. In 1908, Marietta was adopted by the Navajo into the Chee clan.

In addition to running the Wetherill household, Marietta spent much of her time exploring. She made friends with many of the Navajo women and men living in the area. She visited them, supplied them with food, and learned from them. They mutually assisted each other with their births and in other urgent medical situations; since there were no medical professionals in the area, this help could mean the difference between life and death. In return, the Navajos shared their stories with her.

Marietta was upset by the Compulsory Indian Education Act. She assisted several Navajos in locating their children by writing letters to the school authorities, and tracking down missing children. Often the children had died while separated from their parents.

In 1905, Marietta, Richard, and his brother, Winslow, displayed an exhibition at the St. Louis World's Fair. They brought 16 Navajo with them to St. Louis, who demonstrated their dancing, silver-making and blanket-weaving techniques.

The Wetherills’ ranch came to comprise approximately 1000 acres. In addition to their ranching activities, the Wetherills maintained a trading post, trading in sheep and goatskins, livestock, silver, and Native artifacts such as blankets, baskets, and arrowheads. Richard (and occasionally Marietta) also guided teams of explorers and amateur archaeologists in their search for the remains of ancient Native peoples. From 1896 to 1901, the Wetherills were closely associated with the Hyde Exploring Expedition. Marietta kept the records of the discoveries made and the items that were looted. She worked with Dr. Aleš Hrdlička from 1899 until 1904, assisting him in his efforts to determine the Navajos’ racial origins.

== Children ==
Marietta had seven children. Richard, born in 1898; Elizabeth, born in 1900; Robert, born in 1902; Marion, born in 1907; and Ruth, who was born in 1910. In 1911, Ruth died, possibly after eating unfamiliar plants, at the age of one year. Marietta also had two stillborn children, both boys.

== Richard Wetherill's murder ==
In 1910, Richard Wetherill was shot to death at or near the Wetherill homestead. There are varying accounts of his murder, most of which agree that Weatherill was shot by a member of the Navajo tribe known as Chiishchili Biye’, or Chis-chilling-begay. The motive for Weatherill's shooting is not clear. However, many of the eyewitness accounts cite a dispute over a horse. There are also contemporaneous accounts indicating that the local Indian Agent, Samuel F. Statcher, wanted the Wetherills’ land for public use and supplied false information to the Navajos that incited their anger towards Wetherill.

After Richard Weatherill's death, Marietta discovered that the ranch was insolvent. She sold many of the artifacts that they had kept in order to pay off debts and to pay for her court case. She was determined that Chiishchili Biye’ should be punished for his act. However, she regarded the Indian Agent, Samuel F. Stacher, and William T. Shelton (the superintendent of the local Indian School) as the true architects of Weatherill's murder.

After Richard's death, Marietta and her children moved many times, initially to various sites near Cuba, New Mexico. They raised horses and cattle, grew fruit trees, wheat, and oats, and even kept a large flock of ducks. She later moved back to Arizona, and then to Utah.

== Death ==
In her later years, Marietta lived for some years with her son, Richard II, and his wife and family in California. Her four living children later built her a house in Albuquerque. She died in her sleep in that house, on July 11, 1954. In accordance with her wishes, her ashes were buried in Richard Wetherill's grave near the site of their ranch in New Mexico.

== Legacy ==
Since the turn of the 21st century, scholars of anthropology and archaeology have endeavored to recover the work of early women, like Marietta, in these fields. Revisiting the work of Marietta Palmer Wetherill, including both her archaeological inquiry into ancient Chacoan communities and her anthropological observations of living Chacoan communities, made significant contributions to the study of Chaco Canyon. Her keen observations included identifying a prehistoric road north of Pueblo Alto, evidence of prehistoric irrigation systems, a connecting wall between Chetro Ketl and Pueblo Bonito, and burial mounds. These findings, now recognized as crucial to understanding Chaco Canyon's archaeological significance and the histories of the Indigenous people, were largely overlooked during her lifetime due to her lack of formal training, status as a woman, and relationship to her more acclaimed husband.

The dismissal of Marietta's work illustrates broader biases in the fields of archaeology and anthropology during and since her lifetime. Scholars like Jonathan E. Reyman have argued that the widespread disregard of Marietta's work has adversely affected interpretations of Chaco Canyon archaeology for much of the 20th century. While Richard Wetherill and his brother's contributions to archaeology were celebrated despite their lack of formal training, Marietta's observations did not receive the same recognition. Her work with the Wetherill brothers on projects like the 1897 Grand Gulch Expedition and her prolonged involvement at Chaco Canyon positioned her as an informed and capable observer. For example, her documentation of the prehistoric road at Pueblo Alto, initially dismissed, was later confirmed in the 1960s and 1970s through field testing, highlighting the enduring relevance of her insights to Chacoan studies. The rediscovery and validation of her work had challenged historical biases and enriched contemporary understandings of Chaco Canyon's complex cultural and ecological systems.

== Writings and collections ==
Marietta left behind a collection of largely Navajo items: baskets, clothing, figurines, blankets and other textiles, and jewelry. These were donated, at her request, to the Maxwell Museum at the University of New Mexico. The Zimmerman Library at the University of Mexico and New Mexico Archives Online also hold a small collection of her drawings, documentation of various rituals, and several letters, as well as a “Pioneers Foundation Oral History Collection" comprising 78 oral history recordings by Marietta. Records of Marietta's life and work are also housed in the Wetherill Family Collection and Navajo Traders Collection in the Cline Library at Northern Arizona University. The Chaco Culture National Historical Park has a collection dedicated to Marietta's granddaughter, Marion Wetherill Shaffner, which also contains records regarding Marietta's life. Marietta had a large personal collection of pot and pitcher handles, which she believed were sent to the Smithsonian. However, because they were not donated under her name, this is impossible to verify.
