= Cliff Palace =

Cliff dwelling in Colorado, United States

Coordinates: 37°10′00″N 108°28′22″W

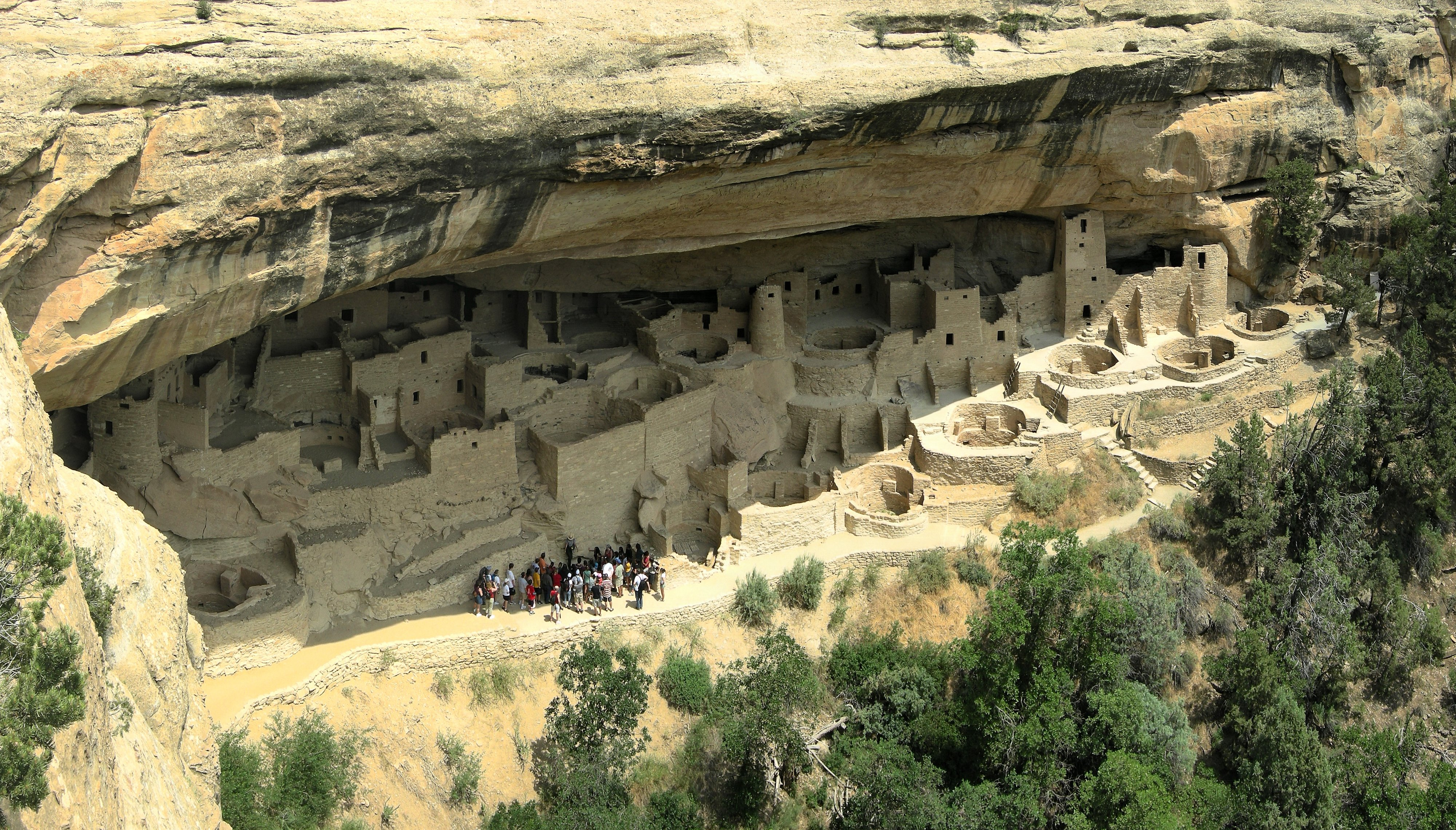
Cliff Palace, Mesa Verde National Park

Cliff Palace is the largest cliff dwelling in North America. The structure built by the Ancestral Puebloans is located in Mesa Verde National Park in their former homeland region. The cliff dwelling and park are in Montezuma County, in the southwestern corner of Colorado, Southwestern United States.

== History ==
It is believed that Cliff Palace was constructed and lived in from about 1200 A.D. to 1300 A.D. The Ancestral Puebloans who constructed this cliff dwelling and the others like it at Mesa Verde were driven to these defensible positions by "increasing competition amidst changing climatic conditions". Cliff Palace was abandoned by 1300, though debate is ongoing as to the cause. Some contend that a series of megadroughts interrupting food production systems was the main cause.

=== Rediscovery ===
Cliff Palace was rediscovered in December 1888 by Richard Wetherill and his brother-in-law, Charlie Mason, while they were looking for stray cattle. Wetherill and Mason also rediscovered Spruce Tree House and Square Tower House, which are also located in Mesa Verde. According to Wetherill and Mason, they "followed the Indian trail down Chapin Mesa, between Cliff and Navajo canyons, and camped at the head of a small branch of the Cliff Palace fork of Cliff Cañon." Wetherill and Mason spent time after finding the dwellings looking at artifacts found within the cliff. According to Mason, they found a stone axe "with the handle still on it" and also observed "parts of several human skeletons scattered about." Wetherill and Mason collected various artifacts from the site over the years, and they kept a detailed record of their discoveries. Wetherill took the first collection of artifacts to Durango, Colorado on March 2, 1889.

=== Preservation ===
Throughout the decade following Cliff Palace's rediscovery, it became a popular destination for tourists and curious explorers. These visitors did not take care of the site as it is taken care of today. This led many of the fragile walls and other structures to crumble. Many of the visitors also took artifacts that they had found, leaving hardly any for future visiting archeologists to find and examine. Richard Wetherill and others became very disturbed by this fact, and they pushed for the establishment of Mesa Verde National Park in order to protect Cliff Palace and other archeological sites in the area. Finally, in 1906, Mesa Verde National Park was established.

== Description ==
=== Construction ===
Cliff Palace was constructed primarily out of sandstone, mortar and wooden beams. The sandstone was shaped using harder stones, and a mortar of soil, water and ash was used to hold everything together. "Chinking" stones were placed within the mortar to fill gaps and provide stability. Then, the inside and outside walls were covered with a thin layer of plaster. Some remains of the plasters are still seen today, as they are characterized by their distinct yellow, white, and red colors. Much of the plaster is gone today, however, because they were the first to erode over time.

Many visitors wonder about the relatively small size of the doorways at Cliff Palace. At the time when Cliff Palace was constructed, the average man was about 5 feet 6 inches (1.68 m) tall, while the average woman was about 5 feet (1.5 m) tall.

=== Rooms ===
==== Kivas ====
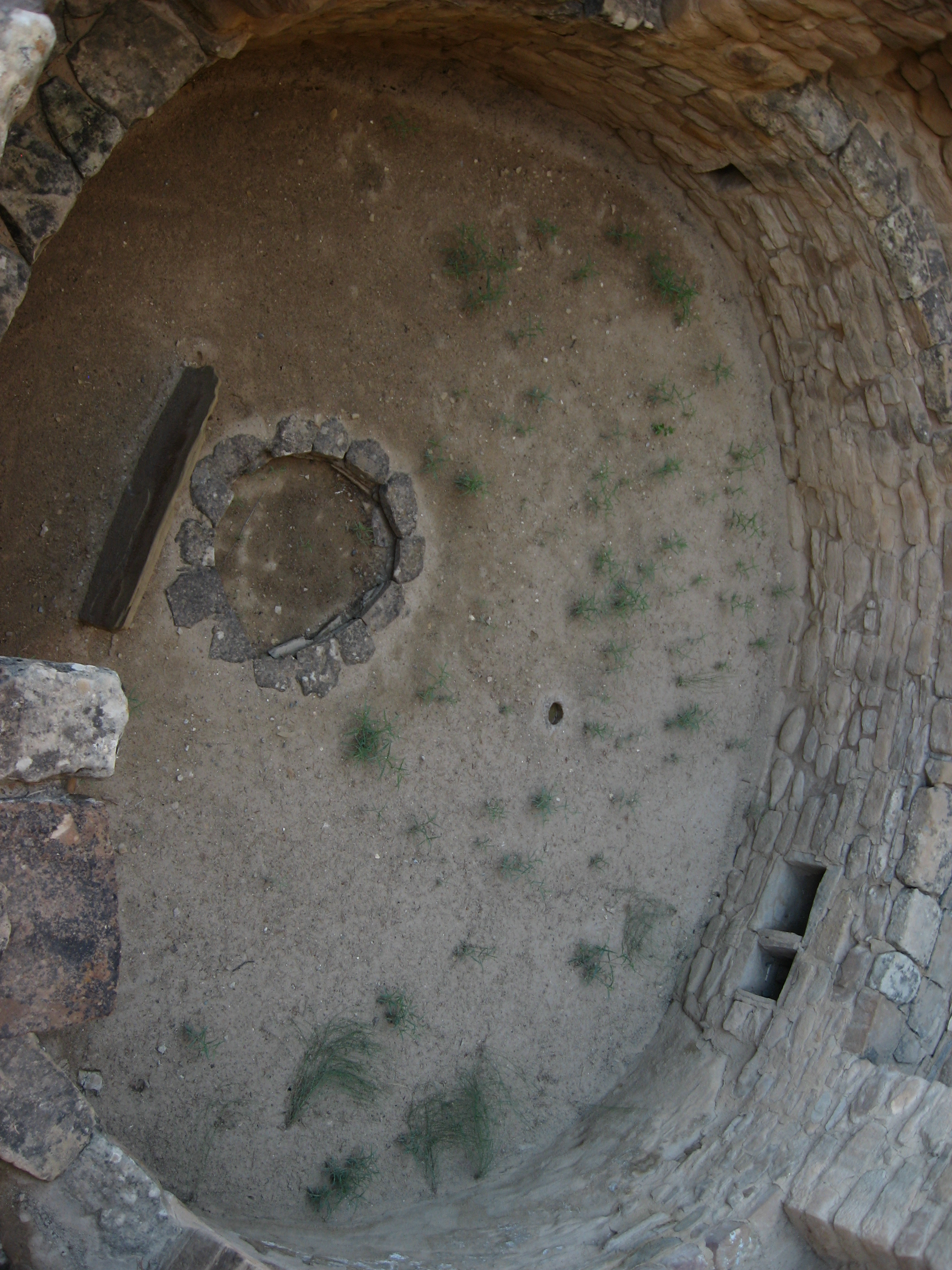
Kiva in Cliff Palace, Mesa Verde

Cliff Palace contains 21 rooms that are kivas, (round sunken rooms of ceremonial importance), and two rooms that contain kiva-like structures. Most kivas at Cliff Palace follow the same basic structure: they all contain six stone pillars, called pilasters, that stand upright and support the roof of the kiva. A firepit sits in the middle of the room on the floor. A ventilation opening and chimney to draw in fresh air are also present in the kiva, in order to air out the smoke from the fires. In addition, most of the kivas have a small hole in the floor, situated between the firepit and wall, called a sipapu. Sipapus are ritual features that are believed to symbolize the entryway for which living souls enter the current world. The two southernmost kivas are connected by an underground tunnel, and experts believe that the purpose of this tunnel was for theatrical disappearances and/or appearances during rituals. Archaeologists believe that Cliff Palace contained more clans than the surrounding Mesa Verde communities. This belief stems from Mesa Verde's higher ratio of rooms to kivas. Cliff Palace has a room-to-kiva ratio of 9 to 1. The average room-to-kiva ratio for a Mesa Verde community is 12 to 1. This high ratio of kivas to rooms may suggest that Cliff Palace might have been the center of a large polity that included surrounding small communities. Because of this, "it is thought that Cliff Palace was a social, administrative site with high ceremonial usage."

==== Living rooms ====
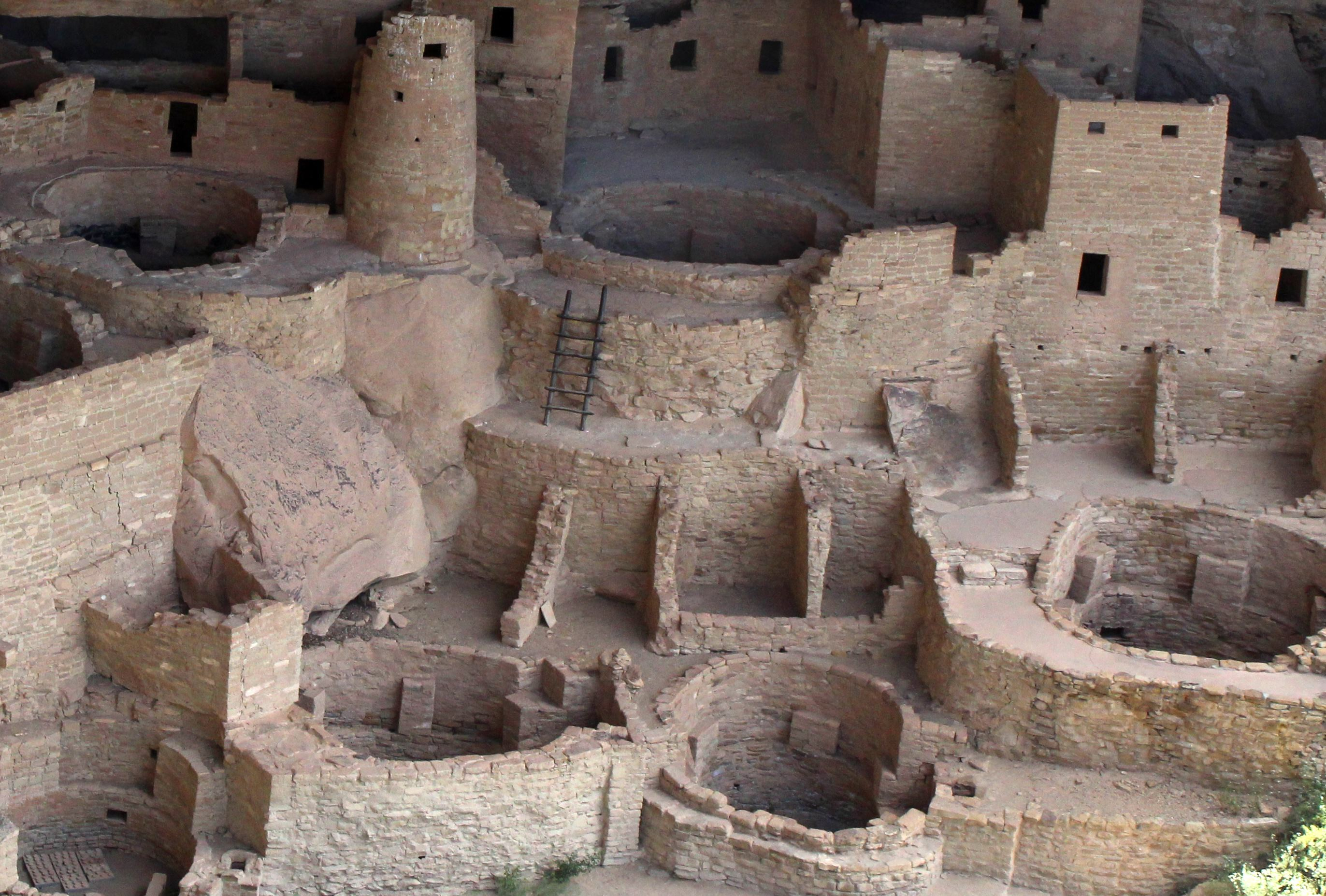
Cliff Palace, Mesa Verde National Park

In addition to the kivas, archaeologists found twenty-five rooms that are interpreted as living rooms. They are interpreted as such because of the presence of residential features like hearths. Archeologists believe that each living room was occupied by 3-4 residents, bringing the overall population of residents at Cliff Palace to approximately 100-120 people. The living rooms were quite small, with most of them at this site measuring 6 feet by 8 feet, and the average height being around 6 feet tall. Because of the short ceilings, ventilation was very poor, and the soot and smoke from the fires can still be seen on the ruins of the roofs of the living rooms.

==== Open areas ====
Many of the rooms at Cliff Palace are without roofs or completely enclosing walls, making them what archeologists named open areas. Some of these areas are interpreted as courtyards, where people would gather and socialize. Other, smaller open areas are considered to be "work areas", where people would go to do tasks such as sharpening tools and grinding meal.

==== Other rooms ====
In addition to the kivas and living rooms, archaeologists also discovered nine storage rooms. They are in the upper level of the alcove, and the rooms are interpreted as granaries. Experts suggest that the reason why these nine rooms are so high could be for protection from snow, sun, and other harsh weather that the people may have experienced. The food could be kept safe, and the residents would not starve during the cold winter months. Wooden ladders were used to climb up to these storage rooms.

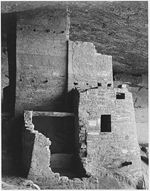
One of the towers of Cliff Palace, photographed by Ansel Adams from 1941 to 1942.

Some of the most famous structures at Cliff Palace are the towers. These towers are large, tall square or cylindrical structures that start at the floor of the cave and were built to outstanding heights. Some of the towers were built alone as free-standing structures, whereas others were accompanied by roofs and walls, with other smaller rooms surrounding them. The tallest tower at Cliff Palace starts at the floor and almost reaches the ceiling of the cave. It is 27 feet (7.9m) tall, and has four different levels inside of it.

== Excavation ==
Even though Cliff Palace was rediscovered in 1888, it was not formally excavated by an archeologist until 1906, when Mesa Verde National Park was established. Jesse Walter Fewkes from The Smithsonian Institution was sent to excavate the alcove. This work included digging for artifacts and repairing the crumbling walls of the site.

=== Artifacts ===
Many artifacts were unearthed when the site was formally excavated in 1906, although Fewkes did note that the site had been "'almost completely rifled of its contents'" by the time he arrived at the site. Despite this, he was still able to uncover many objects that helped him and other archeologists gain a deeper understanding of the Puebloan people who inhabited Cliff Palace and Mesa Verde. Fewkes unearthed objects such as pots, yucca sandals, and cloths made from feathers, yucca, and cotton. He also found various weapons and tools like wooden farming tools, a stone ax, arrow points, hatchets, drills, grinding stones, and stone balls, which he believed may have been used as a weapon or in a game. Lastly, Fewkes found food remainders: corn, squash, pumpkin, beans, and gourds.

== Visiting Cliff Palace ==
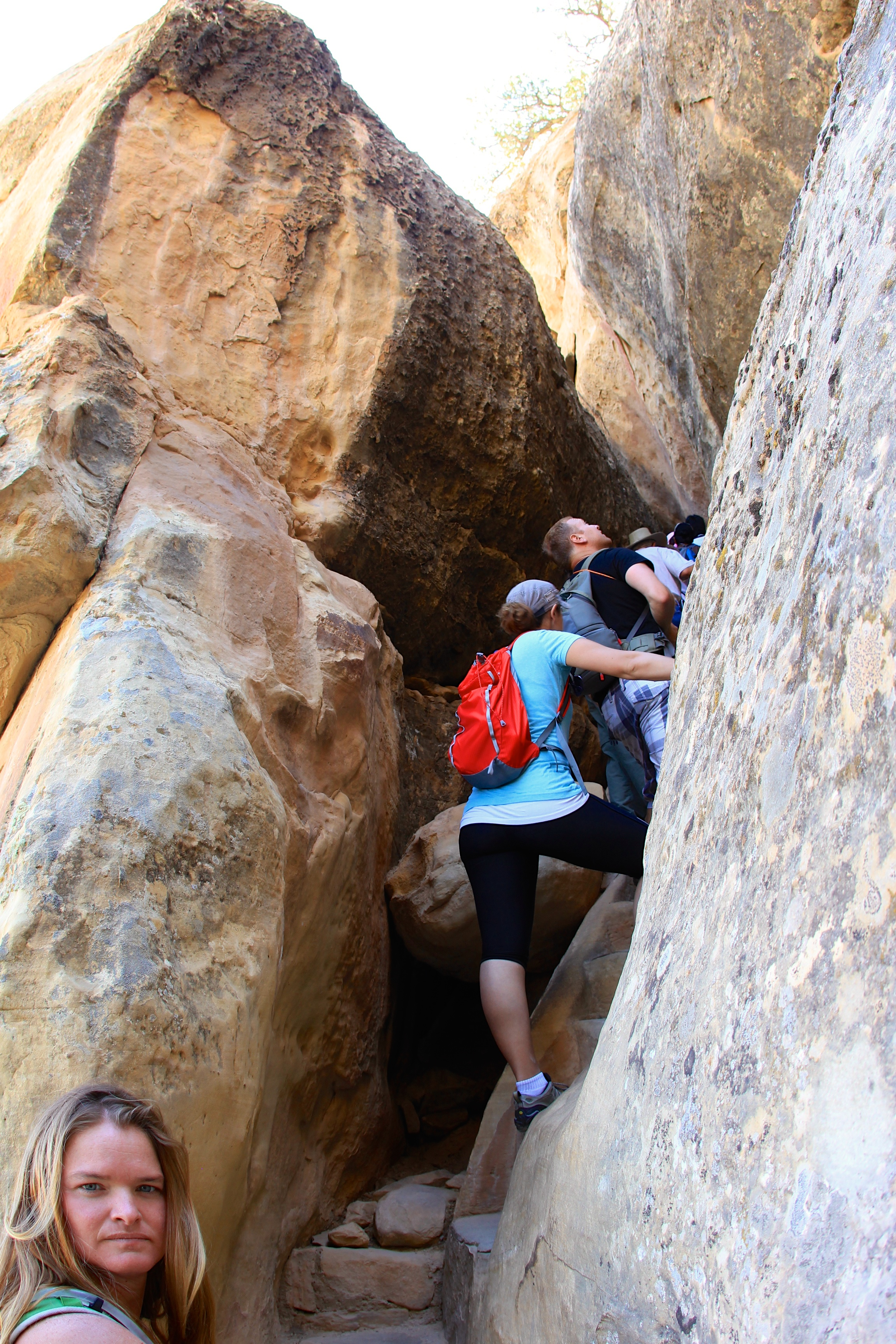
Tourists climbing through the exit from Cliff Palace July 1, 2013

Currently, Cliff Palace is open to the public in Mesa Verde National Park. In the park, there is a six-mile road loop that takes visitors on various stops, including the Cliff Palace overlook. In order to actually go into the site, one must obtain a ticket for a ranger-guided tour. The tour season runs from May through October, and one tour is limited to fifty visitors. The tour typically has a duration of forty-five minutes, and the trail consists of uneven stone steps and four ladders that one must descend. The hike has an elevation change of 100 ft (30 m), and the total distance is 0.25 miles (0.4 km).

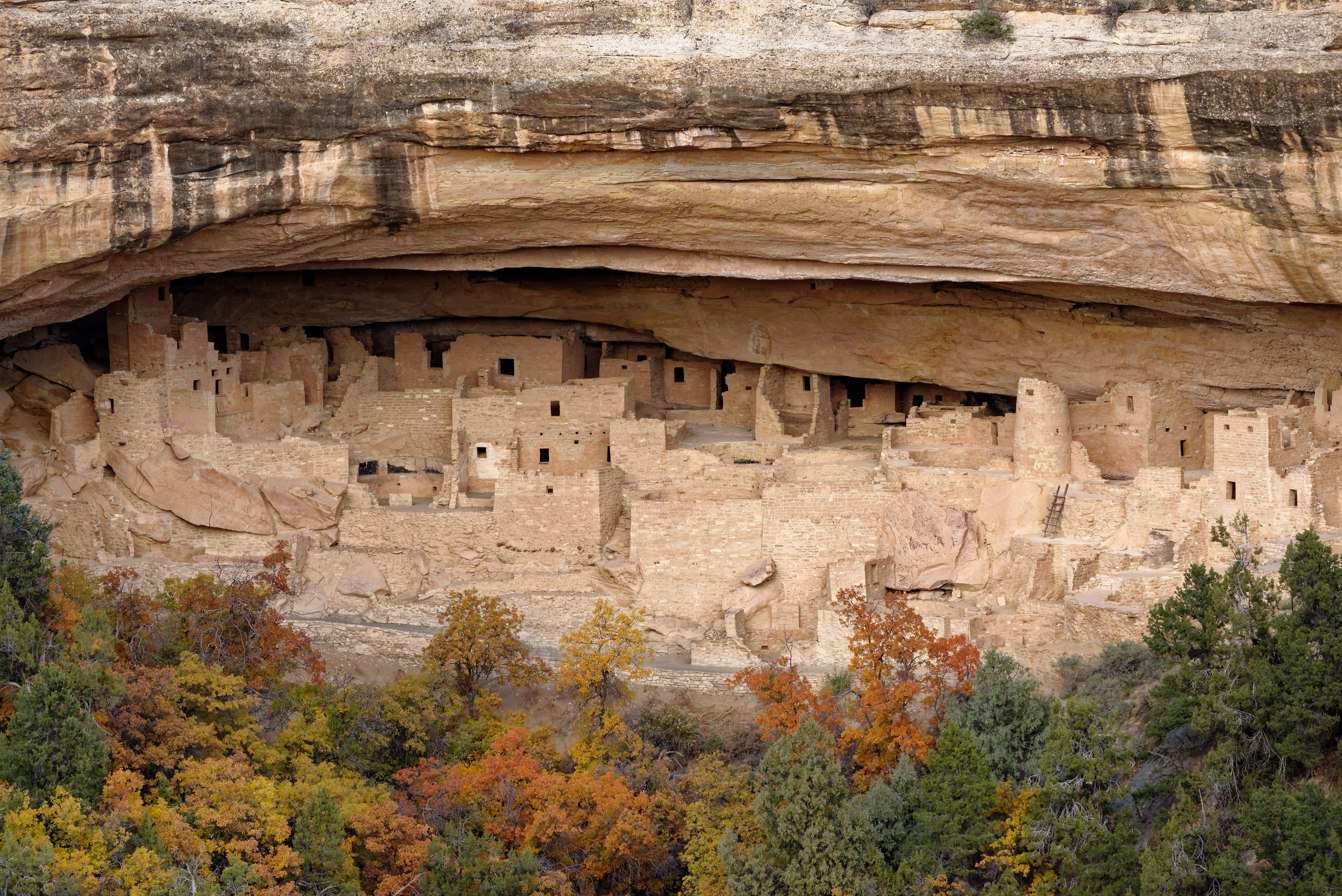
Cliff Palace

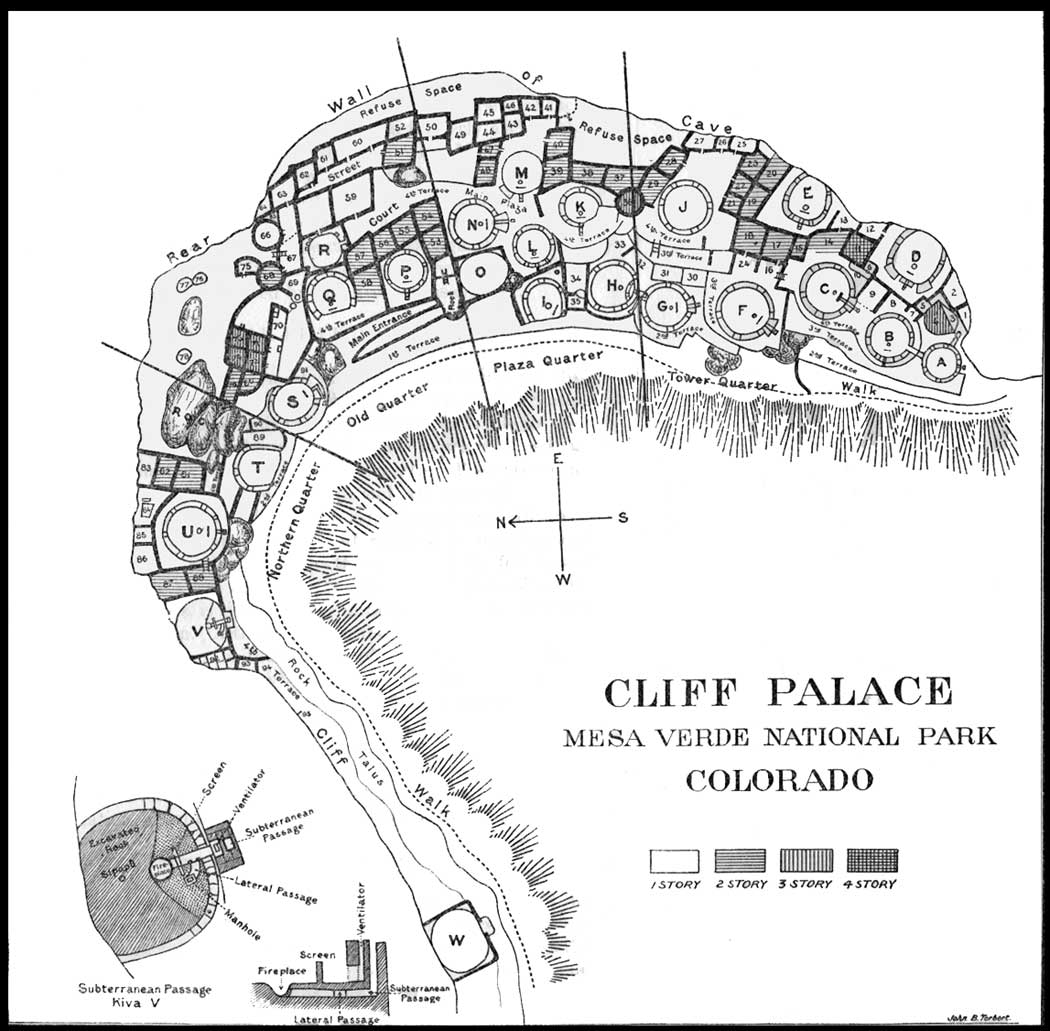
Cliff Palace Ground Plan

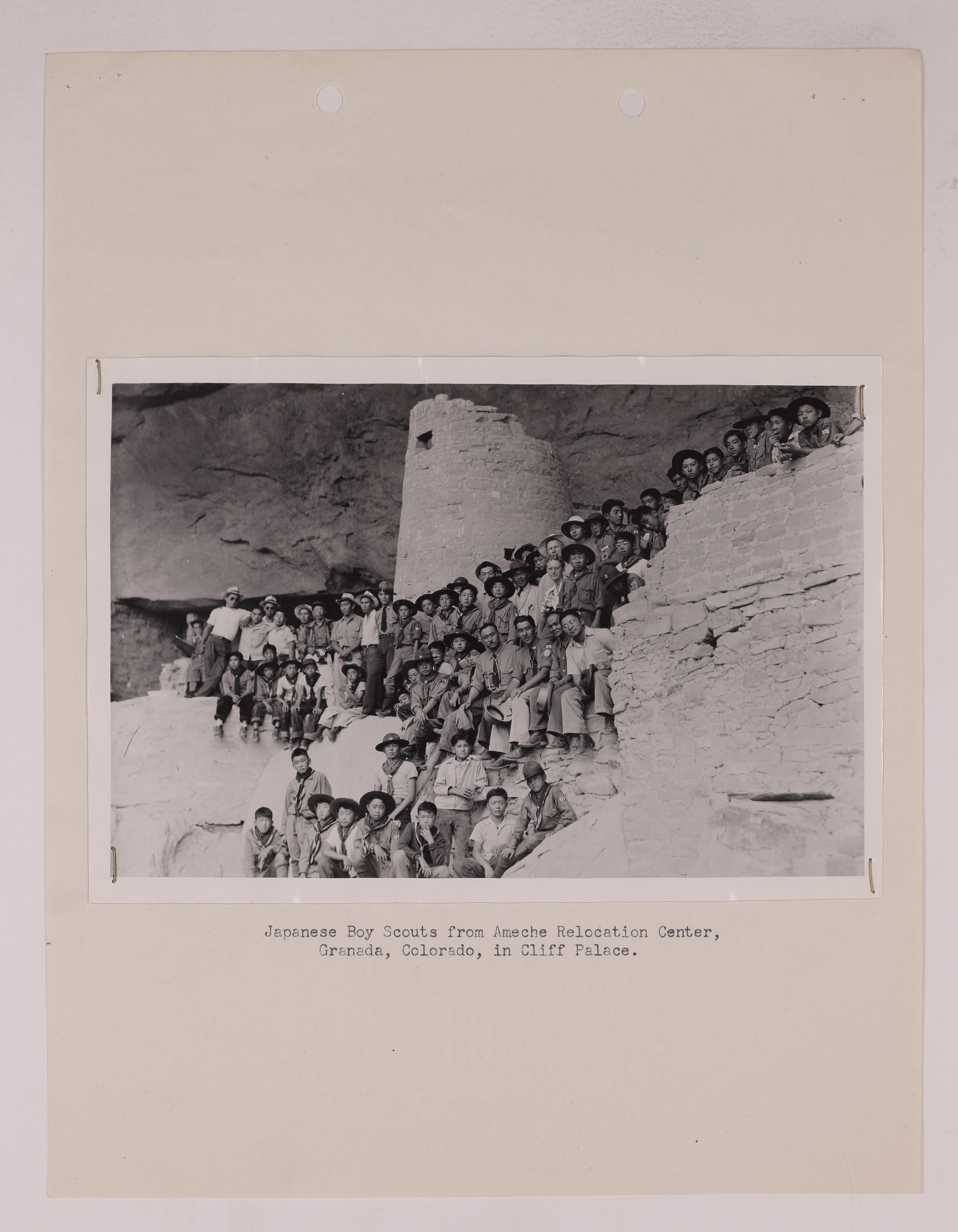
Japanese Boyscouts Visiting Cliff Palace, August 1941

== Bibliography ==
- Chapen, Frederick H. The Land of the Cliff-Dwellers. Appalachian Mountain Club, W. B. Clarke and Co., Boston, 1892. Reprinted by the University of Arizona Press, with notes and foreword by Robert H. Lister, 1988. ISBN 0-8165-1052-0.
- Noble, David Grant. "Ancient Ruins of the Southwest", pp. 36–43.Northland Publishing, Flagstaff, Arizona 1995. ISBN 0-87358-530-5.
- Oppelt, Norman T. "Guide to Prehistoric Ruins of the Southwest", pp. 159–161. Pruett Publishing, Boulder, Colorado, 1989. ISBN 0-87108-783-9.
