= Navajo National Monument =

National monument in Arizona, United States

- IUCN category III (natural monument or feature)
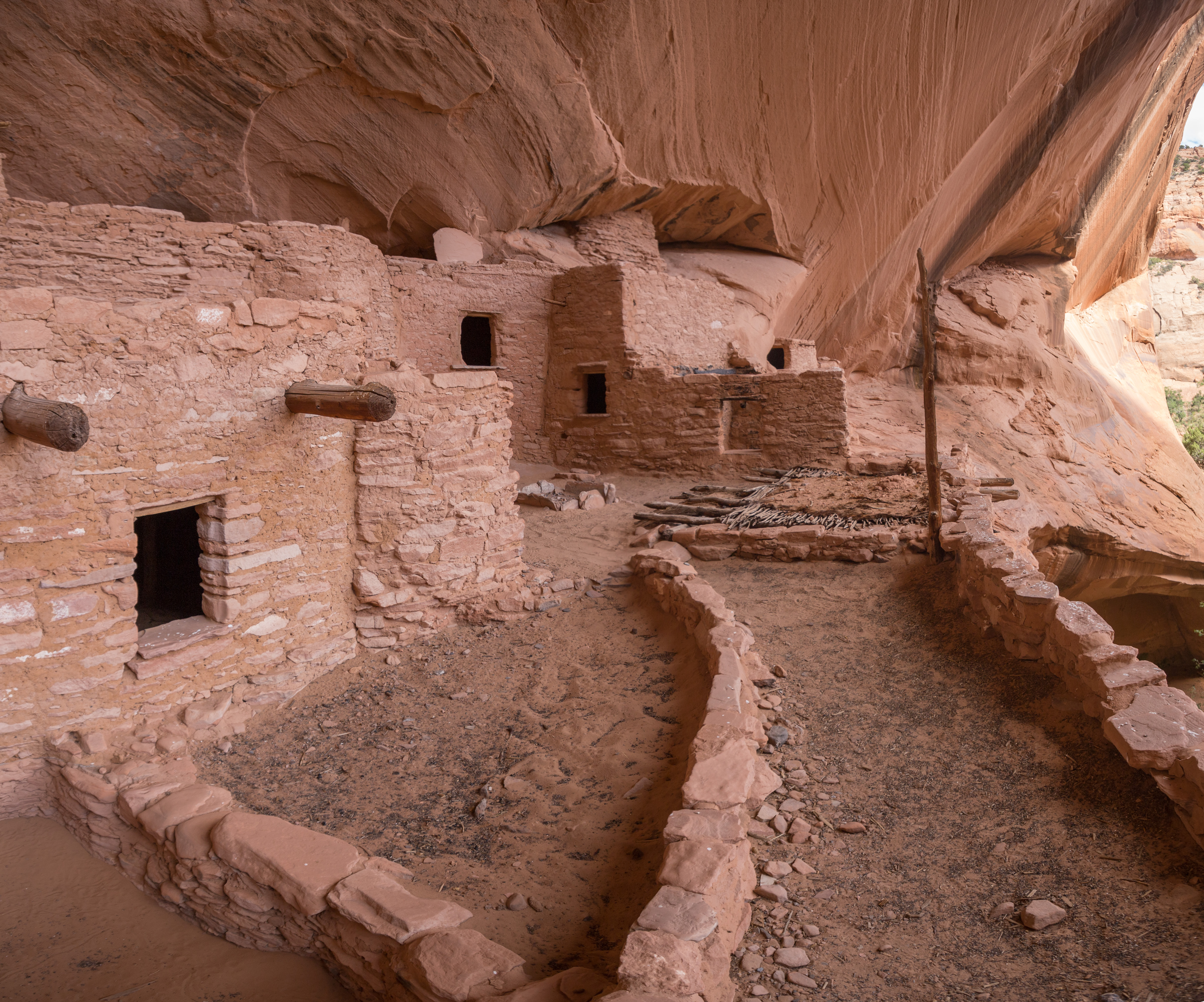
- Keet Seel cliff dwellings
- Interactive map of Navajo National Monument
- Location: Navajo and Coconino counties, Arizona, USA
- Nearest city: Kayenta, Arizona
- Coordinates: 36°40′42″N 110°32′27″W
- Area: 360 acres (150 ha)
- Created: March 20, 1909
- Visitors: 44,099 (in 2025)
- Governing body: National Park Service
- Website: Navajo National Monument
- Navajo National Monument
- U.S. National Register of Historic Places
- NRHP reference No.: 66000176
- Added to NRHP: October 15, 1966

Navajo National Monument is a national monument located within the northwest portion of the Navajo Nation territory in northern Arizona, which was established to preserve three well-preserved cliff dwellings of the Ancestral Puebloan people: Keet Seel (Broken Pottery) (Kitsʼiil), Betatakin (Ledge House) (Bitátʼahkin), and Inscription House (Tsʼah Biiʼ Kin). The monument is high on the Shonto plateau, overlooking the Tsegi Canyon system, west of Kayenta, Arizona. It features a visitor center with a museum, three short self-guided trails, two small primitive campgrounds that are free to the public, and a picnic area.

The Sandal Trail is an accessible self-guided 1.3 mi (2.1 km) roundtrip trail that ends at an overlook of the Betatakin ruins across the 560 ft (170 m) deep Betatakin Canyon. The overlook is the only point in the monument where visitors can view the cliff dwelling other than on the guided tours. Rangers guide visitors on free (3-5 hour long) tours of the Betatakin cliff dwellings and on 17 mi (27 km) roundtrip back-country hikes to the Keet Seel. The Inscription House site, further west, has been closed to public access for many years.

The National Monument was listed on the National Register of Historic Places on October 15, 1966.

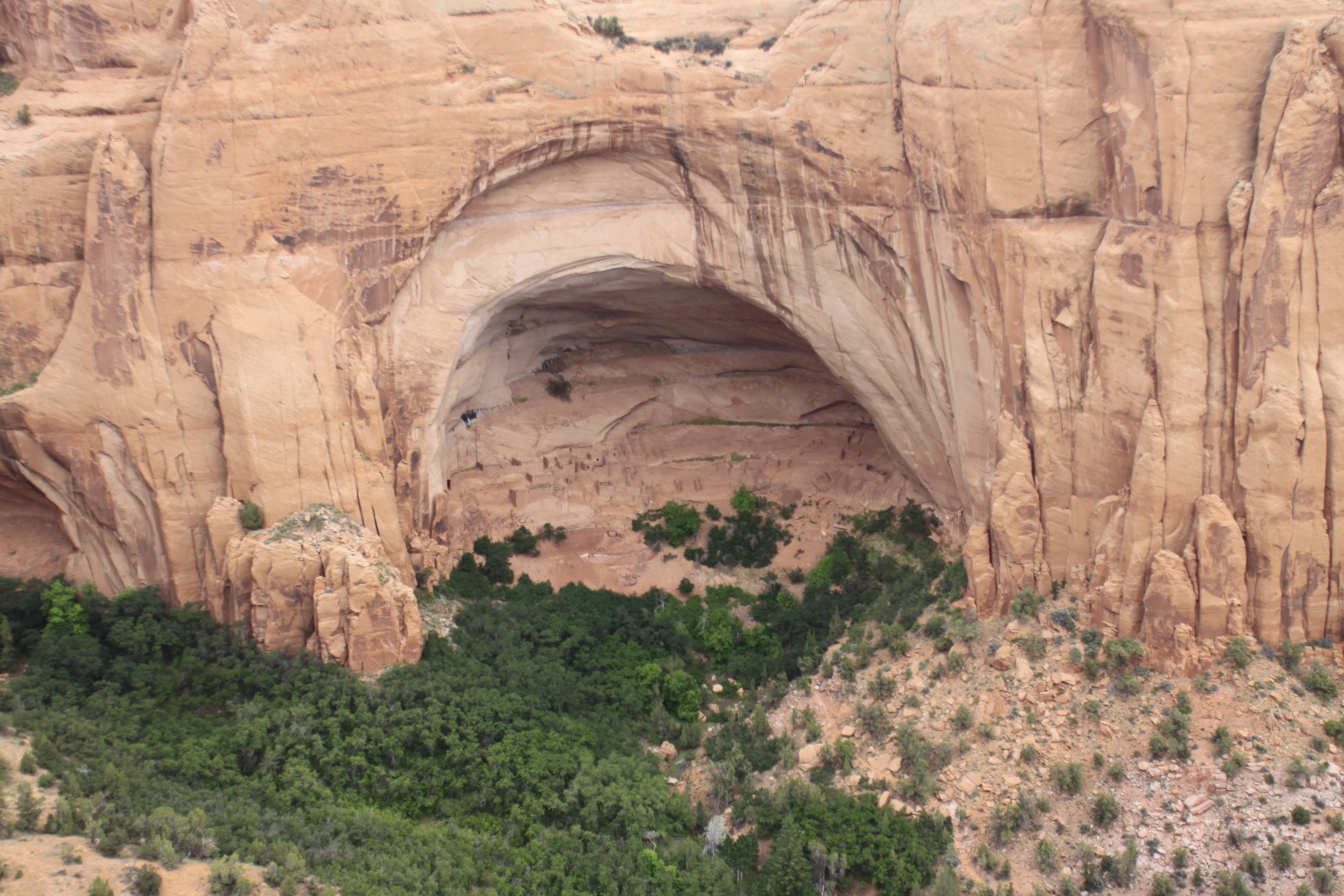
Betatakin in huge alcove, from overlook

== Keet Seel ==
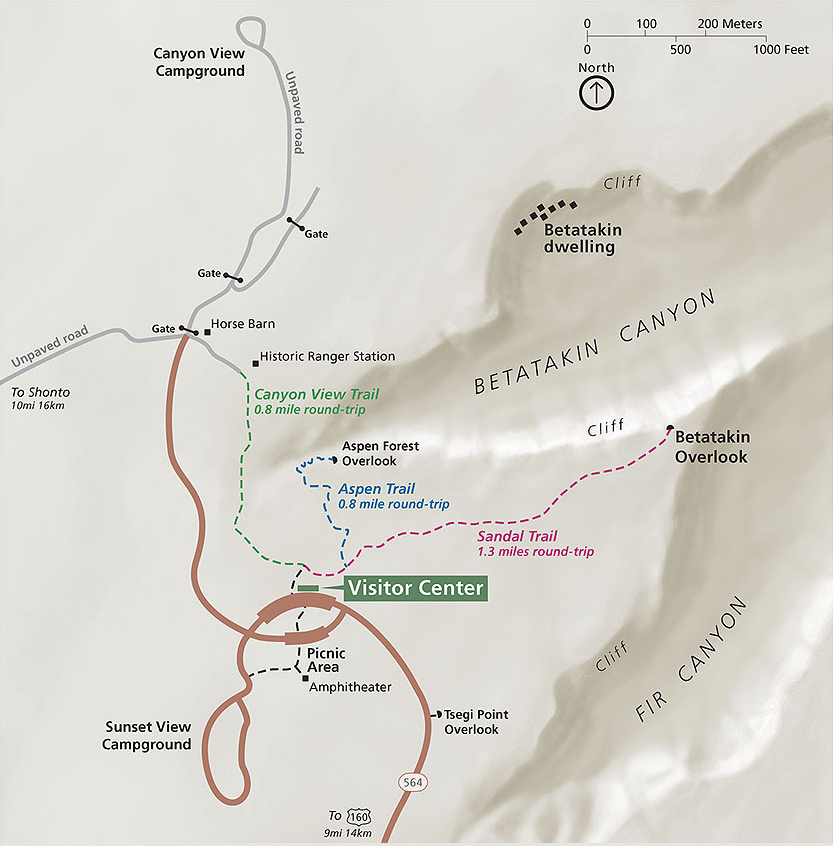
Map of Navajo National Monument

Keet Seel or Kiet Siel (Kįtsʼiil), which stands for "broken pottery scattered around" in Navajo, is a well preserved cliff dwelling of the ancient Ancestral Pueblo people located in a branch of the Tsegi Canyon in the Kayenta region. The site was first occupied at around 1250, during a time in which a large number of people were believed to be aggregating in sites such as this in this part of the American Southwest. There was a construction boom at Keet Seel between 1272 and 1275, with construction then slowly tapering off and halting completely at 1286. Once construction halted in 1286, there was no evidence of structures being built until its subsequent abandonment some 20 years later. It is believed that, at its peak, up to 150 people inhabited this site at one time. Due to the extremely dry climate and natural overhanging cliff the site's dwellings and artifacts are well preserved. Keet Seel is considered by many archaeological experts to be one of the best preserved larger ruins in the American Southwest.

== Betatakin ==
Betatakin means "House Built on a Ledge" in Navajo. In Hopi, the name of the place is Talastima, or "Place of the Corn Tassel". Betatakin is smaller than nearby Keet Seel, with about 120 rooms at the time of abandonment. However, like Keet Seel, Betatakin was constructed of sandstone, mud mortar, and wood. Today only about 80 rooms remain, due to rock falls inside the alcove. Betatakin only has one kiva, whereas Kiet Siel has several. Betatakin was built in an enormous alcove, measuring 452 feet (138 m) high and 370 feet (110 m) across, between 1267 and 1286

The first excavations occurred in 1909 under Byron Cummings of the University of Utah, and continued into the 1950s and 1960s under archaeologists such as Jeffery Dean. During its two-decade heyday Dean estimated a maximum population of about 125 people.

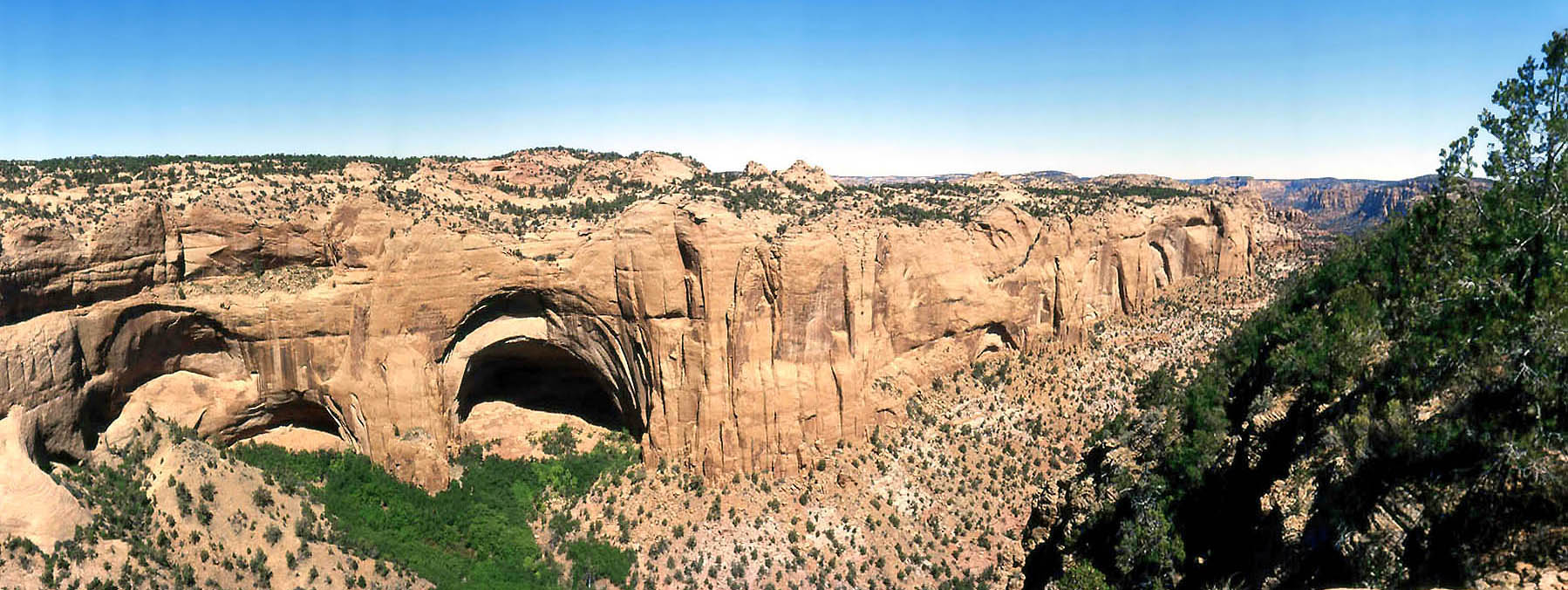
View of cliff dwellings from overlook at Navajo National Monument

== Discovery ==
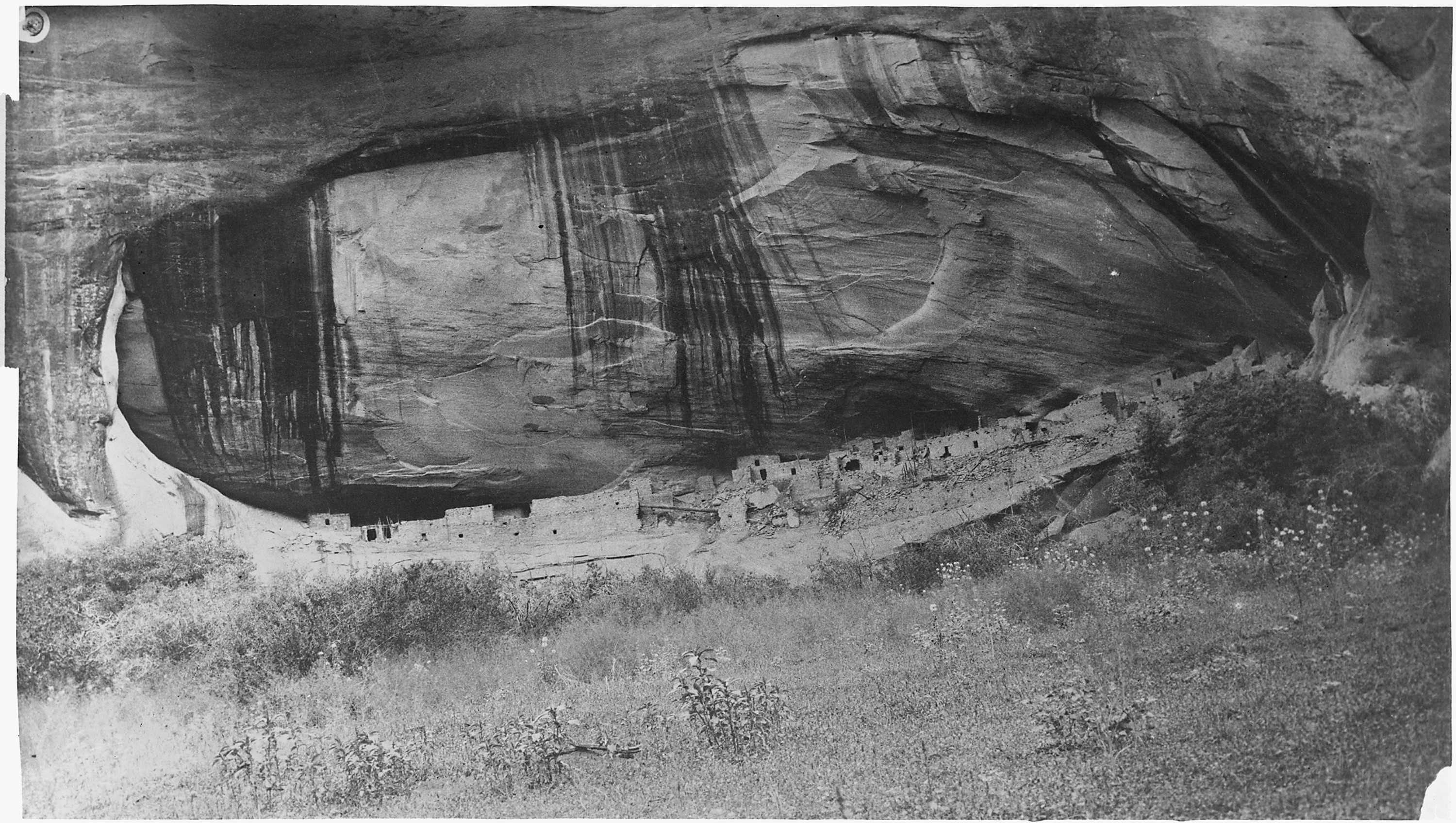
Kit-Siel ruins - NARA (c. 1871 to c. 1907)

The site of Keet Seel was known to resident Navajos in the area for decades or longer prior to the first Europeans arriving in 1895 (the Wetherill brothers). Originally part of a ranching family from Colorado, the Wetherills' keen interest in the Ancestral Puebloans led them to pursue numerous expeditions into the heart of the Kayenta region, largely uncovering a number of sites that had remained undiscovered to Anglos until then. The Wetherills took many artifacts from the ruins which the Navajos had left untouched for centuries. Richard Wetherill is credited for selecting the term Anasazi, which refers to the ancient people (ancestral puebloans) that inhabited this region and means "Ancient Enemy Ancestors" in Navajo. It was not until 1909, after Navajo National Monument was created, that John Wetherill, Byron Cummings, and Navajo guide Clatsozen Benully first recorded Betatakin. The Wetherill Brothers made a living from giving guided tours of sites in and around the Tsegi Canyon and Utah. Later in their careers, the Wetherill brothers were largely involved in efforts for the preservation and protection of the sites that made up Navajo National Monument. The artifacts which the Wetherills had removed from the Ancestral Pueblo sites were sold or shipped to far-flung locations so that today little is known of the artifacts' whereabouts.

== Subsistence ==
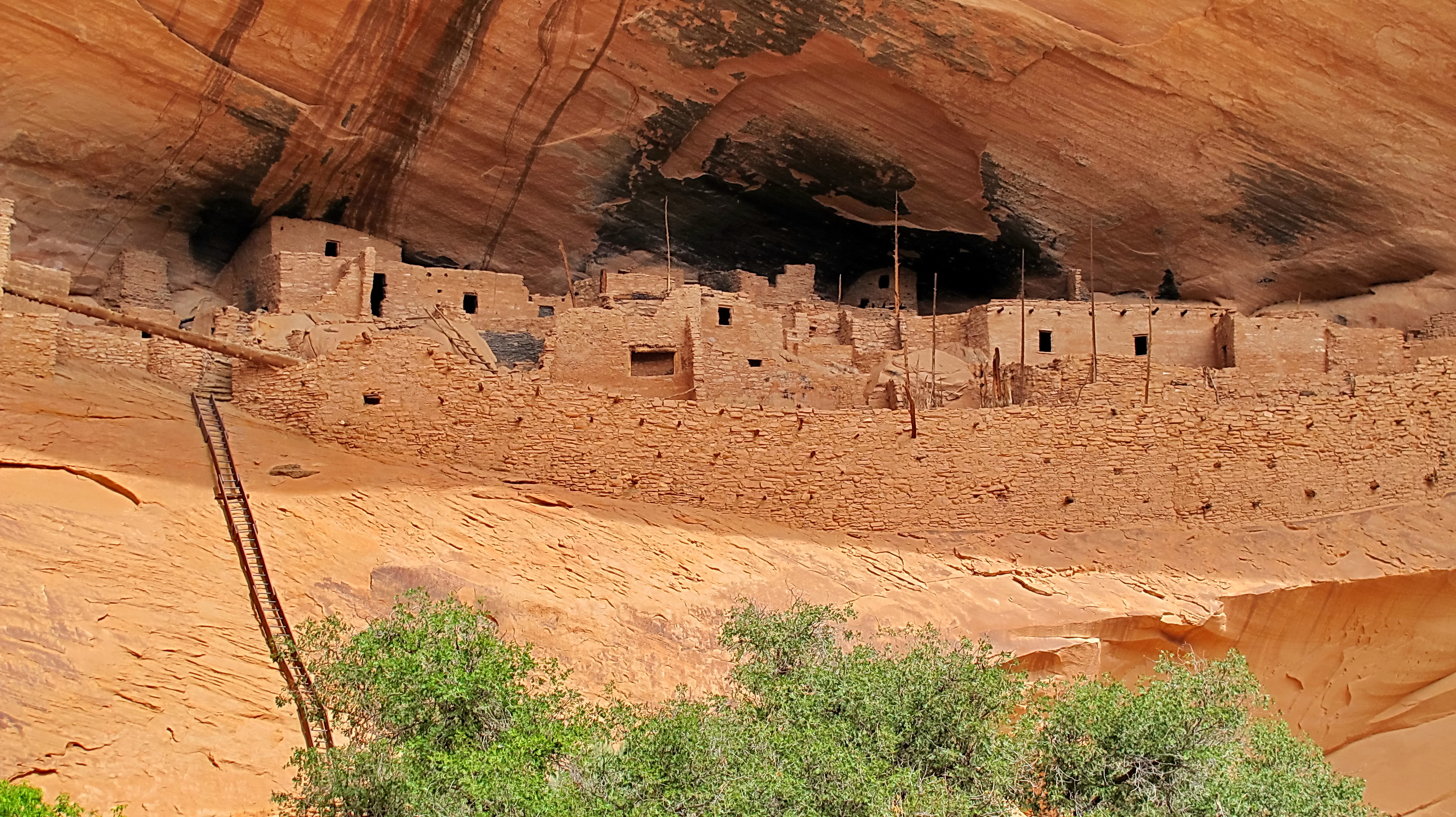
Approach ladders, Keet Seel ruins, 2012

The Ancestral Pueblo people of this area were a sedentary group that largely based their subsistence on agriculture. Their primary crop at the sites within Navajo National Monument was maize, with beans and cucurbits also being incorporated into their diet. While the people of the Tsegi Canyon system relied heavily on agriculture for their food, they also hunted wild game that was indigenous to the area.

It is thought that these Ancestral Pueblo people lived in these cave dwellings to optimize the amount of sustainable land to produce crops. By living in these caves, and not on the mesas or the canyon floors, they were able to use this land towards agricultural production to ensure their success in this high elevation, desert environment. The ruins that make up Navajo National Monument were a large number of rooms used for storage, suggesting that at some point their crop production was successful enough to dedicate a significant amount of their living area towards storage purposes.

== Dwellings/Architecture ==
Cliff Dwelling of Keet Seel, Navajo Reservation, Kayenta, Navajo County, AZ (1933)

The structures contained within this cave site were constructed mainly of sandstone blocks plastered together with mud and mortar. In marked contrast to earlier constructions and villages on top of the mesas, the cliff dwelling of Navajo National Monument reflected a region-wide trend towards the aggregation of growing regional populations into close, highly defensible quarters during the mid to late 13th century.

While much of the construction in this site remains similar to common ancestral Pueblo architectural forms, including such features as Kivas, a circular tower (at Keet Seel), and pit-houses, the limited space that this site presented created a much more densely populated living area. At its peak, Keet Seel had more than 150 rooms and 6 kivas, while Betatakin had about 120 rooms and only one kiva.

Jacal walls were also found to be used at this site. Jacal walls were made from a screen of upright wooden poles plastered together with mud. The dry conditions and protection from the elements at Keet Seel allowed for preservation of these architectural characteristics.

There were also a number of structures believed to be built at the base of the cliff as well. But due to this area not being protected by the over-hanging cliff wall, its exposure to the elements led to its destruction by erosion. At Keet Seel, archaeological excavations have revealed that there were 25 room clusters beneath the overhanging wall, each that included one common living room, with anywhere from one to four storage rooms surrounding a small courtyard. The layout of these dwellings greatly mirrored that of the Pueblo III structures at Mesa Verde, whereas Betatakin had about 20 room clusters.

== Depopulation ==
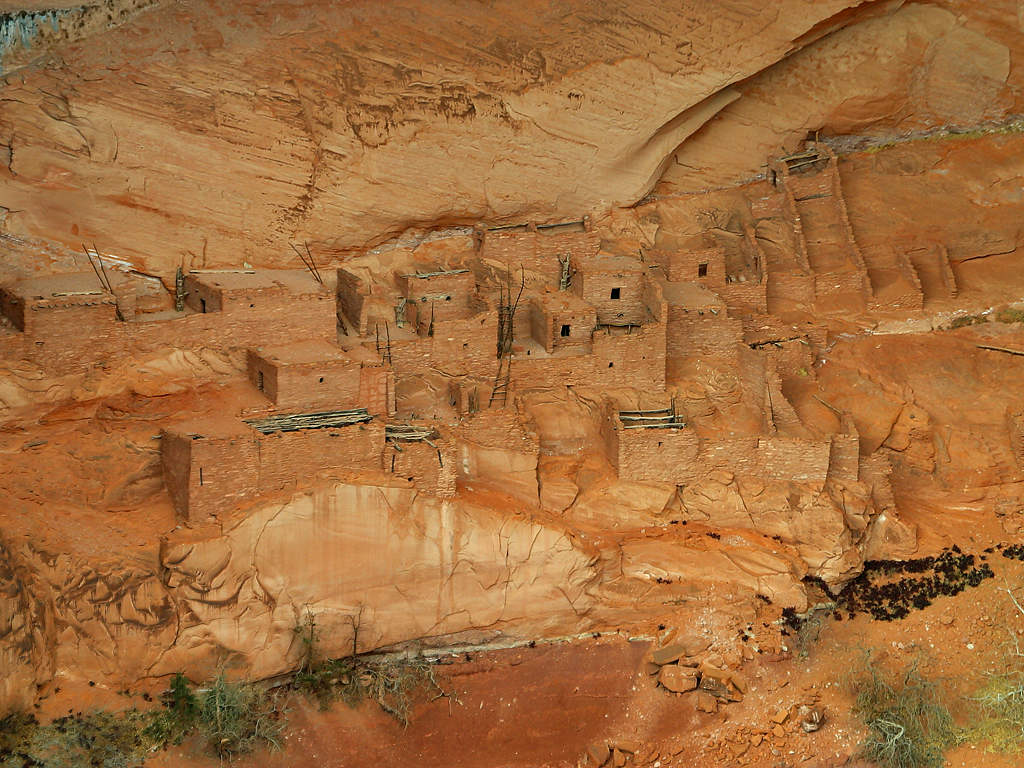
Betatakin ruins in Betatakin Canyon

Although many archaeologists agree that there is a definitive and sharp exodus from this region in the Southwest, there has been considerable debate on the determining factors that forced people to migrate out of this area. Archaeologists have determined that there was a distinct decrease in the amount of annual precipitation between AD 1276 and 1299, a period of time that is now referred to as the "Great Drought". With the limited amount of rainfall in an already arid environment, there is no doubt that there was a considerable amount of increased stress put on the agricultural systems that these people depended on.

There is evidence later in the record to suggest the beginning of an episode of deep arroyo cutting, that would have damaged what was left of the usable agricultural land. Increased deposition of sediment onto agricultural lands caused the lowering of the water table, thus making the land inadequate for farming. Regardless of their reasoning, near the end of the thirteenth century it's evident that the Ancestral Pueblo people migrated towards places with more stable and abundant water sources, suggesting that the agricultural land in this area had become unsuitable to sustain the population levels that once inhabited this spectacular cave site.

Hopi legends tell a different tale. According to oral tradition, the area known as Wunuqa (modern day Tsegi Canyon) was abandoned as part of a spiritual quest. In particular, the Snake Clan inhabited the Navajo National Monument ruins, along with the Horn Clan. The Horn Clan forced the Snake Clan out, due to the children of the Snake Clan biting other children and causing death. This may be an allegory for some historical occurrence, in which one group forced another out for a perceived fault or slight.

== Designation ==
President William Taft originally designated the monument in 1909. In 1912, he reduced the monument to three specific tracts of land: a 160-acre (65 ha) tract surrounding Betata Kin, a 160-acre (65 ha) tract surrounding Keet Seel, and a 40-acre (16 ha) tract surrounding Inscription House.

== Climate ==
Navajo National Monument has a cold semi-arid climate (Köppen: BSk) with cold winters and hot summers.

Climate data for Navajo National Monument, Arizona, 1991–2020 normals, extremes 1939–present
Month	Jan	Feb	Mar	Apr	May	Jun	Jul	Aug	Sep	Oct	Nov	Dec	Year
Record high °F (°C)	61 (16)	69 (21)	76 (24)	90 (32)	94 (34)	101 (38)	100 (38)	98 (37)	96 (36)	93 (34)	70 (21)	61 (16)	101 (38)
Mean maximum °F (°C)	51.8 (11.0)	55.9 (13.3)	65.6 (18.7)	74.1 (23.4)	82.8 (28.2)	91.3 (32.9)	93.5 (34.2)	90.7 (32.6)	86.0 (30.0)	77.0 (25.0)	64.4 (18.0)	54.1 (12.3)	94.5 (34.7)
Mean daily maximum °F (°C)	39.9 (4.4)	43.8 (6.6)	52.5 (11.4)	60.7 (15.9)	70.8 (21.6)	82.1 (27.8)	85.7 (29.8)	82.9 (28.3)	76.2 (24.6)	63.9 (17.7)	50.7 (10.4)	40.3 (4.6)	62.5 (16.9)
Daily mean °F (°C)	31.0 (−0.6)	34.1 (1.2)	41.4 (5.2)	47.9 (8.8)	57.5 (14.2)	68.3 (20.2)	72.9 (22.7)	70.6 (21.4)	63.9 (17.7)	52.5 (11.4)	40.5 (4.7)	31.2 (−0.4)	51.0 (10.6)
Mean daily minimum °F (°C)	22.0 (−5.6)	24.5 (−4.2)	30.2 (−1.0)	35.1 (1.7)	44.3 (6.8)	54.6 (12.6)	60.1 (15.6)	58.2 (14.6)	51.7 (10.9)	41.2 (5.1)	30.2 (−1.0)	22.1 (−5.5)	39.5 (4.2)
Mean minimum °F (°C)	7.3 (−13.7)	10.3 (−12.1)	16.6 (−8.6)	20.4 (−6.4)	29.3 (−1.5)	41.0 (5.0)	51.0 (10.6)	49.0 (9.4)	38.4 (3.6)	25.4 (−3.7)	13.8 (−10.1)	7.8 (−13.4)	2.8 (−16.2)
Record low °F (°C)	−11 (−24)	−14 (−26)	2 (−17)	0 (−18)	19 (−7)	28 (−2)	30 (−1)	33 (1)	23 (−5)	7 (−14)	−2 (−19)	−14 (−26)	−14 (−26)
Average precipitation inches (mm)	1.17 (30)	1.03 (26)	0.79 (20)	0.64 (16)	0.58 (15)	0.18 (4.6)	1.23 (31)	1.45 (37)	1.23 (31)	0.96 (24)	0.69 (18)	1.16 (29)	11.11 (282)
Average snowfall inches (cm)	8.3 (21)	9.1 (23)	3.7 (9.4)	3.3 (8.4)	0.4 (1.0)	0.0 (0.0)	0.0 (0.0)	0.0 (0.0)	0.0 (0.0)	0.3 (0.76)	3.2 (8.1)	7.2 (18)	35.5 (90)
Average precipitation days (≥ 0.01 inch)	5.2	5.3	4.1	2.8	3.0	1.3	5.6	6.7	4.9	3.5	3.2	4.0	49.6
Average snowy days (≥ 0.1 inch)	3.8	3.5	2.0	1.0	0.1	0.0	0.0	0.0	0.0	0.3	1.9	3.4	16.0
Source: NOAA

== See also ==
- List of national monuments of the United States
- Canyon de Chelly National Monument
- Mesa Verde National Park
- Oasisamerica cultures

== Related Readings ==
1. Doyel, David E. & Dean, Jeffrey S. "Environmental Change and Human Adaptation in the Ancient American Southwest". The University of Utah Press, Salt Lake City. 1996
2. Ferguson W.M. & Rohn A.H. "Anasazi Ruins of the Southwest in Color". The University of New Mexico Press, Albuquerque. 1999
3. Noble, David Grant. "Houses Beneath the Rock: The Anasazi of Canyon de Chelly and Navajo National Monument". Ancient City Press, Santa Fe, New Mexico. 1986
4. Plog, Stephen. "Ancient Peoples of the American Southwest". Thames & Hudson Inc., 500 Fifth Avenue, New York, New York 10110. 1997
5. Rothman, Hal. "Navajo National Monument: A Place and Its People". Southwest Cultural Resources Center. Santa Fe, New Mexico. Professional Papers No. 40, 1991
