= Hyde Exploring Expedition =

Archaeology in the Southwestern US (1896–1901)

The Hyde Exploring Expedition, sponsored by brothers Talbot and Fred Hyde Jr., who were grandsons and heirs of Babbitt Hyde and heirs to the Benjamin T. Babbitt Bab-O soap company fortune, and directed by Dr. George H. Pepper, conducted excavations in Chaco Canyon from 1896 to 1901, when accusations of impropriety levied by Edgar L. Hewett put an end to their archeological surveys. A subsequent investigation by Steven Holsinger of the United States General Land Office vindicated the Hydes and their partner, Richard Wetherill.
