= Richard Wetherill =

American archaeologist

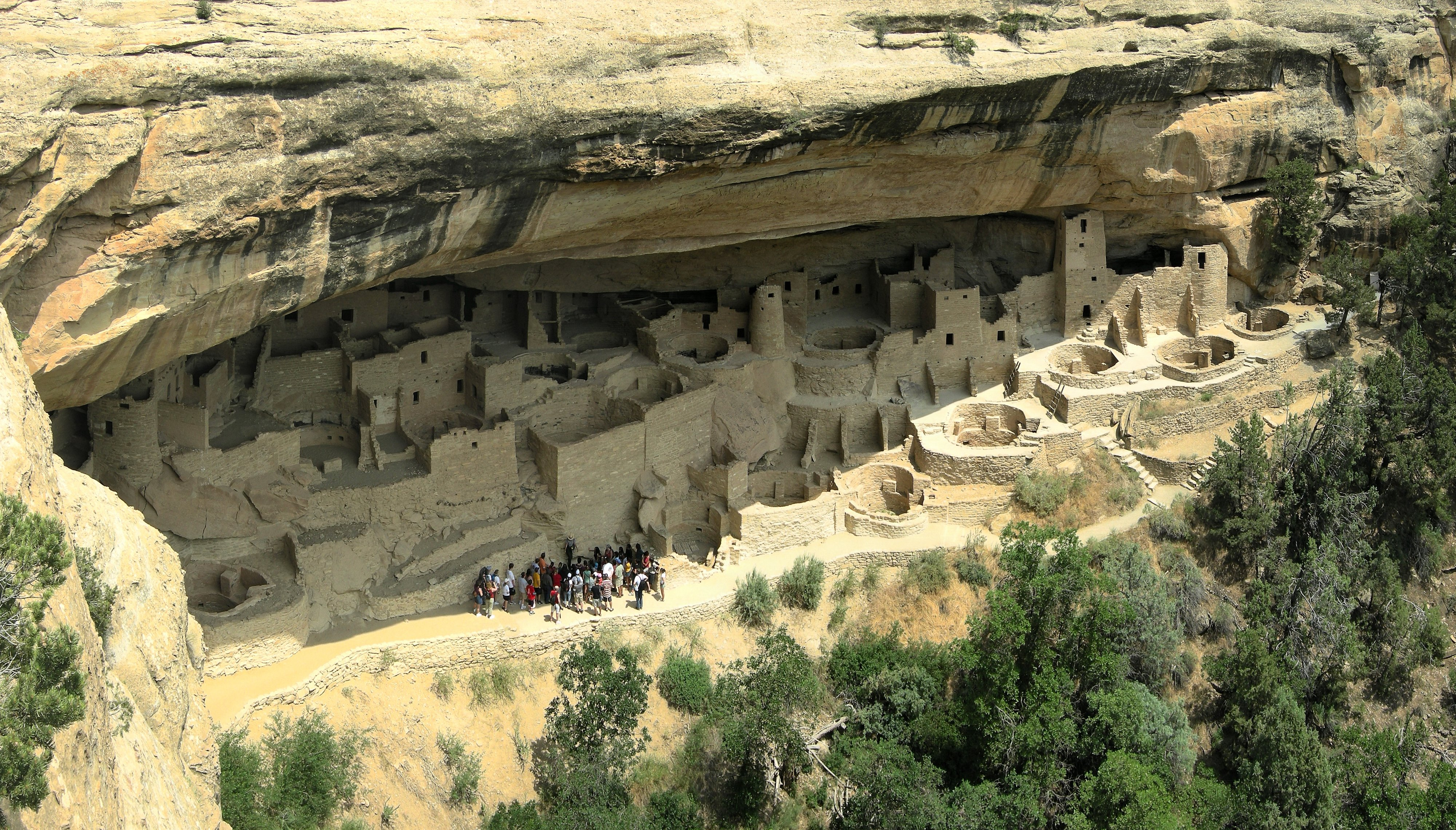
- Cliff Palace, first excavated by Wetherill.
- Born: June 12, 1858; Chester, Pennsylvania, U.S.
- Died: June 22, 1910 (aged 52); Chaco Canyon, New Mexico, U.S.
- Scientific career
- Fields: Archaeology

Richard Wetherill (1858–1910), a member of a Colorado ranching family, was an amateur archaeologist who discovered, researched and excavated sites associated with the Ancient Pueblo People. He is credited with the rediscovery of Cliff Palace in Mesa Verde in Colorado and was responsible for initially selecting the term Anasazi, Navajo for ancient enemies, as the name for these ancient people. He also excavated Kiet Seel ruin, now in Navajo National Monument in northeastern Arizona, and Pueblo Bonito in Chaco Canyon, New Mexico.

Wetherill was fascinated by the ruins and artifacts of the Southwestern United States and made a living as a rancher, guide, excavator of ancient ruins, and trading post operator. He was criticized as a "pot hunter" by his archaeologist competitors, although many of the artifacts he found were sold or donated to prominent museums and his work was often financed or overseen by museums. In 1910, he was murdered in mysterious circumstances by a Navajo in Chaco Canyon.

Wetherill's work was important in securing the designation of Mesa Verde as a National Park and Chaco Canyon as a National Monument.

== Early life and family ==
Richard Wetherill was born June 12, 1858, the oldest of five sons and two daughters of Quaker parents Benjamin Kite (B.K.) Wetherill and Marion Tompkins, in Chester, Pennsylvania. When Richard was one year old, his family moved to Fort Leavenworth, Kansas. In 1876 the family moved to Joplin, Missouri and three years later to Rico, Colorado. In 1880 the family settled in the valley of the Mancos River in Colorado. In 1882, the family founded the Alamo Ranch, 3 mi (4.8 km) south of the town of Mancos on homesteaded land. By 1895 the family owned 1,000 acres (400 ha) of heavily mortgaged land.

Richard Wetherill married Marietta Palmer on December 12, 1896, in Sacramento, California. The couple had five children: Richard, Elizabeth, Robert, Marion, and Ruth.

== Mesa Verde ==
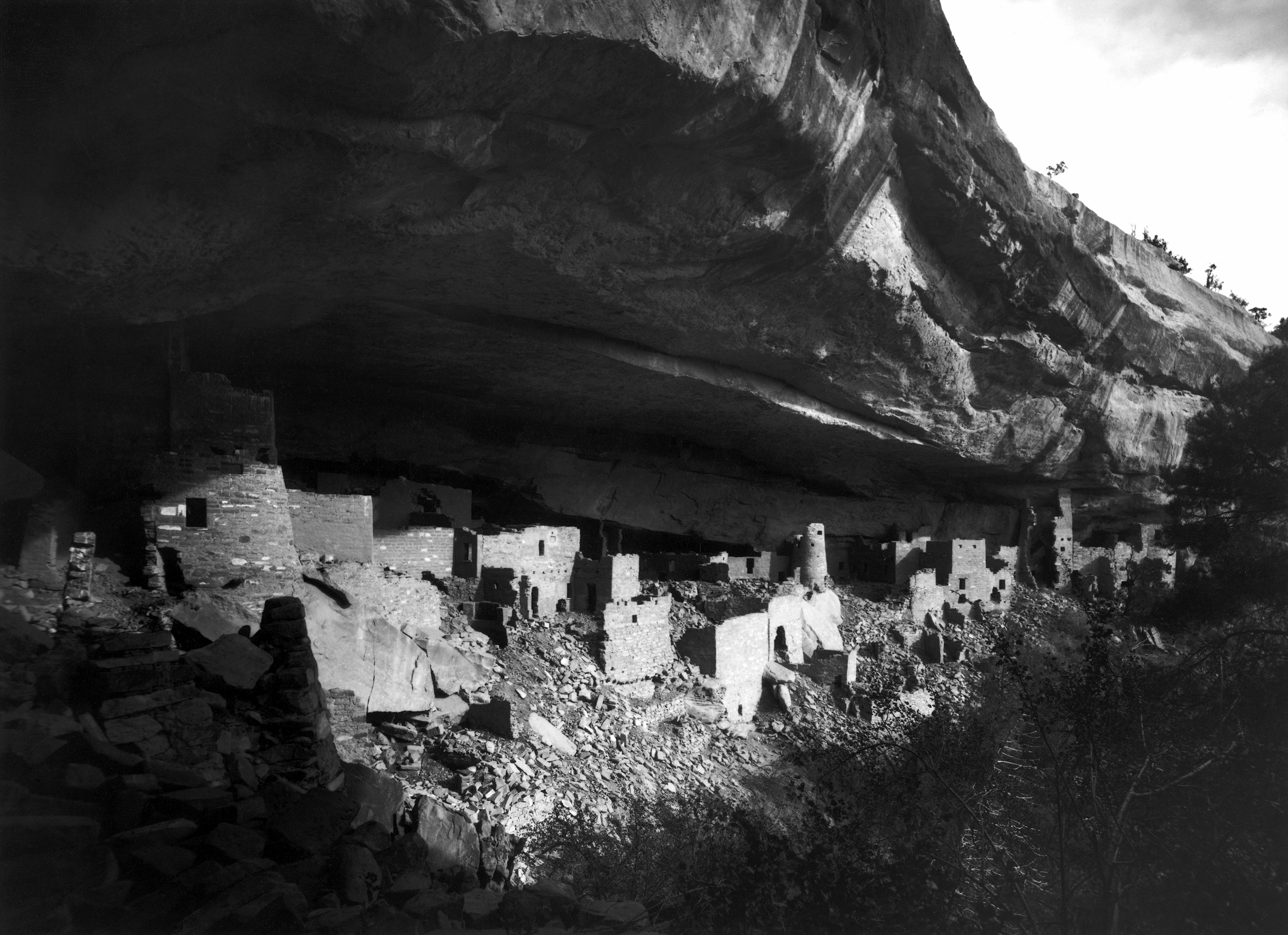
The Cliff Palace at Mesa Verde photo by Gustaf Nordenskiöld, 1891

The Wetherill family grazed their cattle along the Mancos River south of their ranch. The ancient ruins in the canyon were known to travelers and the Wetherill brothers were enthusiastic seekers of ruins and artifacts. A Ute Indian named Acowitz told Richard Wetherill of a large ruin in Cliff Canyon. On 18 December 1888 Wetherill and his brother in law, Charlie Mason, first saw the Cliff Palace from the top of the mesa. Cliff Palace, named by Wetherill, is the largest cliff dwelling in the United States and had been undisturbed for almost 700 years since abandoned by the Ancestral Puebloans. Richard Wetherill along with his father B.K. Wetherill, brothers Al, John and Win, extended family, and neighbors explored Cliff Palace, digging, excavating, cataloging, photographing, and gathering artifacts. The Wetherills sold some of their finds to the Historical Society of Colorado. B. K. Wetherill offered a collection of artifacts to the Smithsonian Institution, but funds to purchase them were not available.

News of Wetherill's find spread rapidly. Among the people who stayed with the Wetherills to explore the cliff dwellings was mountaineer, photographer, and author Frederick H. Chapin who visited the region during 1889 and 1890. He described the landscape and ruins in an 1890 article and later in an 1892 book, The Land of the Cliff-Dwellers, which he illustrated with hand-drawn maps and personal photographs. The Wetherills also hosted Gustaf Nordenskiöld, a Swede and the son of polar explorer Adolf Erik Nordenskiöld, in 1891. Nordenskiöld continued excavations begun by the Wetherills on the impressive Cliff Palace. In 1893, Nordenskiöld published an illustrated and scientific account of his investigations called The Cliff Dwellers of the Mesa Verde. Nordenskiöld had his artifacts sent to his home country, sparking antagonism and lawsuits against him and the Wetherills in the United States. The furor ultimately resulted in the adoption of the U.S. Antiquities Act, forbidding the export of antiquities without a license, and the designation of Mesa Verde as a National Park in 1906.

Nordenskiöld taught Wetherill the rudimentary archeological techniques of the day (which essentially were to dig with a trowel not a shovel, and to make copious notes on findings). He called Wetherill a cowboy "with a surprising degree of education." Throughout Wetherill's life he was derided by professional archaeologists and dismissed as a "pot hunter" and "vandal." However, many of the largest archaeological museums in the United States would employ Weatherill, finance his expeditions, and purchase his findings. Wetherill named the cliff dwellers the Anasazi, the Navajo term for "ancient enemy," and would also coin the term "basket people" for his discoveries of a pre-cliff dweller people later known as Basket Makers." Wetherill's claim that the Basket Makers preceded the cliff dwellers was discounted for many years by archaeologists, but has proven to be accurate.

== Tsegi Canyon ==
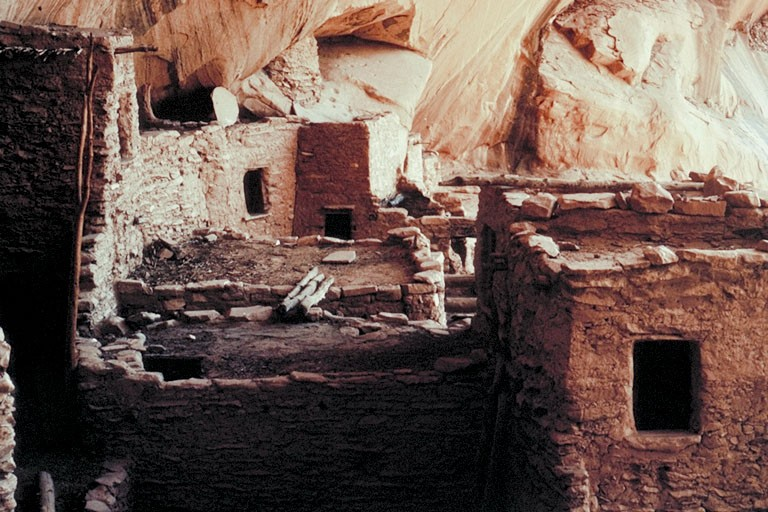
Keet Siel

In 1892, Wetherill met Frederick E. Hyde, a New York physician with an interest in archaeology. Hyde, his sons, and Wetherill founded the Hyde Exploring Expedition, Hyde specified that all artifacts, notes, and records were to be turned over to the American Museum of Natural History. Wetherill led a team that excavated Grand Gulch in Utah in 1893 and 1894. In 1895, Richard Wetherill, his brother Al, and Charlie Mason journeyed to Arizona and excavated the Keet Siel (Broken Pottery) ruin in Tsegi Canyon, now part of the Navajo National Monument. Keet Siel has a spectacular setting with buildings up to three stories high. "Slightly smaller than Cliff Palace, Kiet Seel possesses qualities that, in the eyes of some, lend it greater charm and interest." Wetherill described his findings as "the finest collection of pottery I have seen."

== Chaco Canyon ==
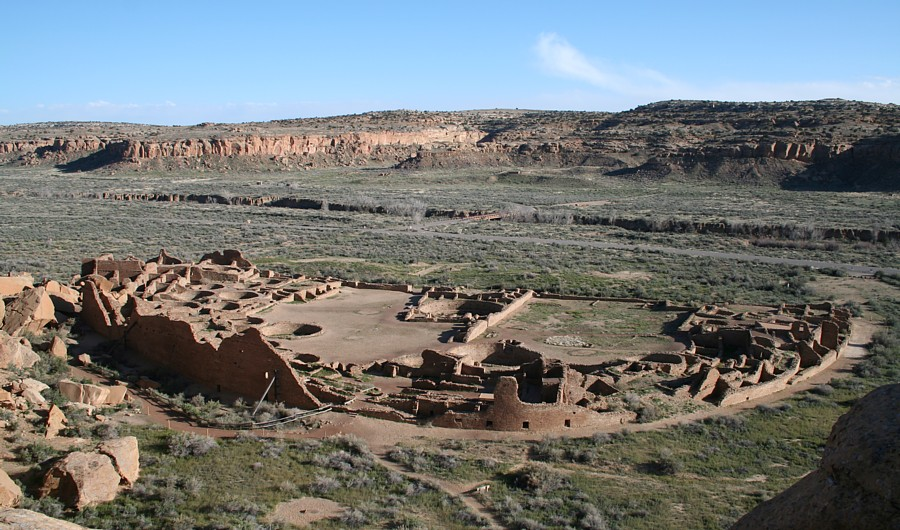
Pueblo Bonito in Chaco Canyon.

In 1896, Wetherill, and the Hyde Exploring Expedition (HEE) undertook massive excavation operations in Chaco Canyon on the Navajo Reservation under the oversight of the American Museum of Natural History. George Pepper, a 23-year old employee of the Museum who had never been in New Mexico, was appointed to lead the expedition, and Wetherill was relegated to a secondary position of supervising the excavations by Navajo laborers. Pepper deplored the physical labor involved in unearthing artifacts and the relations between him and Wetherill were strained.

Wetherill excavated the Pueblo Bonito great house and at the end of the first season sent a railroad freight car of artifacts to the American Museum. Additional excavations in Chaco canyon in 1897, 1898, and 1899 produced more artifacts. However, the Wetherill family was suffering financial losses. Alamo ranch in Colorado was heavily in debt (and would be foreclosed and sold at auction in 1902). Richard Wetherill needed a source of income. He opened a trading post at Chaco Canyon utilizing the rooms at Pueblo Bonito to store goods. Wetherill used wooden beams from the structures of the ruin to build a three-room house as his trading post and as living accommodations for Pepper and Wetherill, his wife Marietta, infant son, and a nanny. Marietta did most of the trading and was called "Asdzani" ("Little Woman") by the Navajo. Wetherill was called "Anasazi" by the Navajo, and he adopted the name for the culture he was excavating. The Wetherill family prospered in their endeavor. By 1901, they operated eight trading posts, a wholesale store in Albuquerque, a retail store in New York, and bought and sold Navajo carpets. Richard's brother, John, and his wife, Louisa Wade Wetherill, managed one of the trading posts.

Wetherill's activities at Chaco Canyon aroused the ire of professional archaeologists. In 1901, Edgar Lee Hewett, President of New Mexico Highlands University accused the Hydes and Wetherill of being "professional pot hunters...vandalizing the ruins of the Chaco." The Governor of New Mexico territory and the Santa Fe Archaeological Society joined in the denunciation. Federal investigations in 1901 and 1902 cleared the Hydes and Wetherill of the charges, but Wetherill was pushed out of his position with the Hyde Exploring Expedition. Responding to his archaeological critics, Wetherill filed a claim under the Homestead Act asserting ownership of 160 acres of land, including many of the ruins at Chaco Canyon. The claim was initially disallowed but in 1907 was approved, minus the major ruins. Wetherill accumulated a large number of livestock, which caused friction with the Navajos as his livestock was competing with theirs for the sparse pasturage near Chaco Canyon. He was also criticized by the superintendent of the Navajo Reservation who apparently saw Wetherill as a competitor for influence among the Navajos.

In 1905 Richard, his brother Win, and his wife Marietta built an exhibition at the St. Louis World's Fair, bringing 16 Navajos with them. In 1907 Richard relinquished his claim on the ruins in Chaco Canyon, contingent on its becoming a National Park. President Theodore Roosevelt proclaimed Chaco Canyon National Monument on March 11, 1907.

== Death ==
In 1910, Wetherill was still living in Chaco Canyon, homesteading and operating a trading post at Pueblo Bonito. On June 22, he was shot and killed by a young Navajo, Chiishchilí Biyeʼ. Depending on the source, Wetherill was either murdered in cold blood by the Navajo or, alternatively, the murderer was influenced by the local Indian Agent against the Wetherills due to political disputes over the use of Chaco Canyon. The agent, Samuel F. Statcher, wanted to dam the canyon for water, fence both ends for grazing and build an Indian School (a forced "Americanizing" of the natives) among the ruins. Biye', charged with the murder, served several years in prison, but was released in 1914 due to poor health. Often described as a wealthy or prosperous man, Wetherill's only asset at the time of his death was ranch property worth five thousand dollars. He was owed more than eleven thousand dollars by Navajos, Hispanics, and Anglos. Little of the money owed Wetherill was ever collected by his widow who lived in modest circumstances, dying in Albuquerque in 1954.

Wetherill and his wife Marietta are buried in the small cemetery west of Pueblo Bonito along with several Navajos. The cemetery lies just over a hundred meters west of Bonito behind a wooden fence. Richard Wetherill's heirs donated a large collection of artifacts to the University of New Mexico in 1954.
