= Clovis point =

New World prehistoric projectile

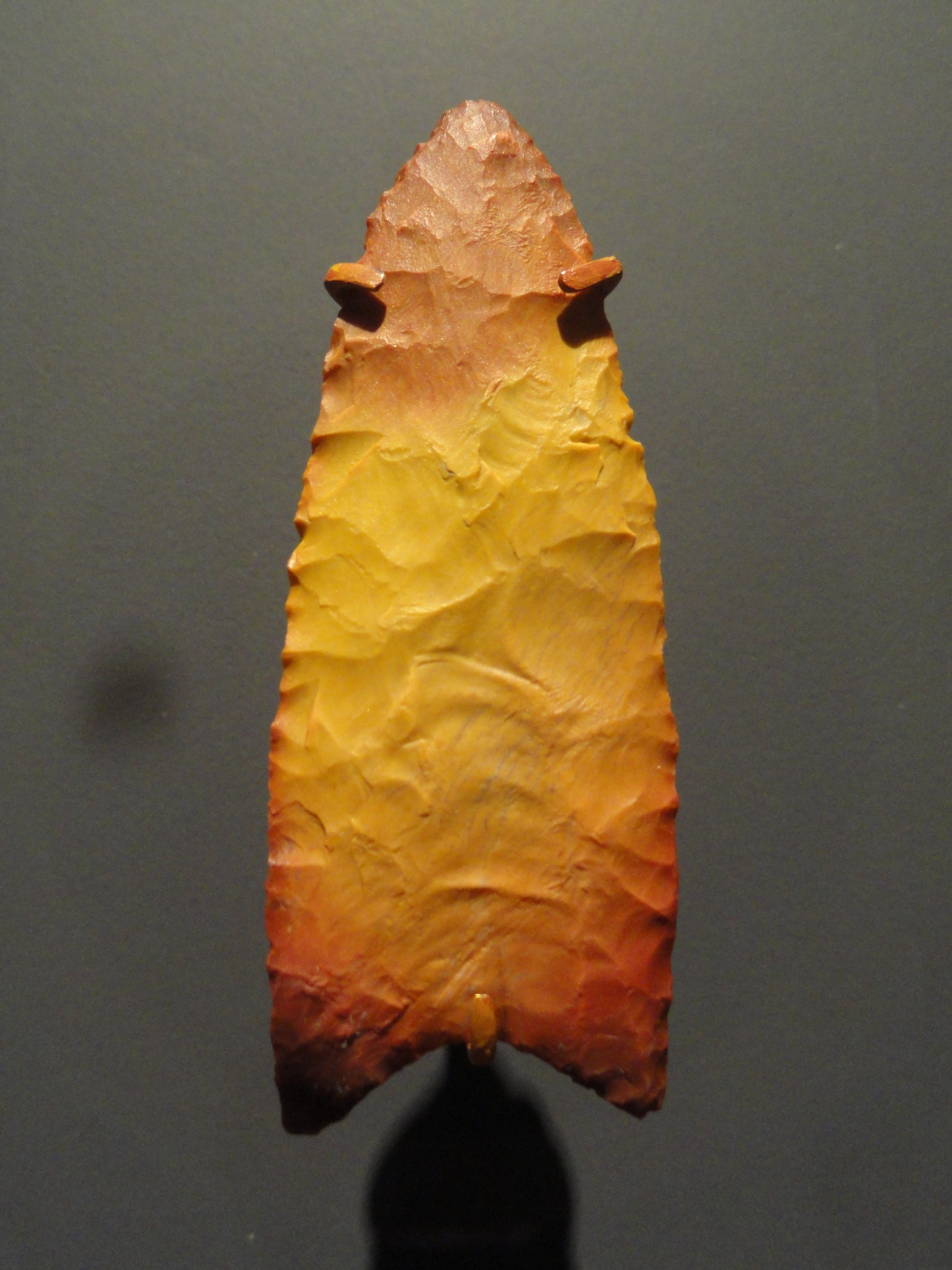
Clovis point, 11500–9000 BC, Sevier County, Utah, chert

Clovis points are the characteristically fluted projectile points associated with the New World Clovis culture, a prehistoric Paleo-American culture. They are present in dense concentrations across much of North America and they are largely restricted to the north of South America. There are slight differences in points found in the Eastern United States sometimes leading them to be called "Clovis-like". Clovis points date to the Early Paleoindian period, with all known points dating from roughly 13,400–12,700 years ago (11,500 to 10,800 C14 years BP). As an example, Clovis remains at the Murry Springs Site date to around 12,900 calendar years ago (10,900 ± 50 C14 years BP). Clovis fluted points are named after the city of Clovis, New Mexico, where examples were first found in 1929 by Ridgely Whiteman.

A typical Clovis point is a medium to large lanceolate point with sharp edges, a third of an inch thick, one to two inches wide, and about four inches (10 cm) long. Sides are parallel to convex, and exhibit careful pressure flaking along the blade edge. The broadest area is towards the base which is distinctly concave with concave grooves called "flutes" removed from one or, more commonly, both surfaces of the blade. The lower edges of the blade and base are ground to dull edges for hafting. There is debate about how Clovis points were used. Originally it was assumed that they were used in a thrusting spear. Later suggestions arose that the points had been used as throwing spears, either as is or with spear thrower (atlatl) which technically would be considered darts, or as a braced weapon (pike). It is also possible the points were used in the animal butchering process.

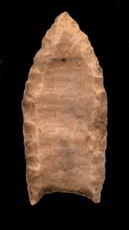
Folsom point for comparison

Around 10,000 years before present, a new type of fluted projectile point called Folsom appeared in archaeological deposits, and Clovis-style points disappeared from the continental United States. Most Folsom points are shorter in length than Clovis points and exhibit longer flutes and different pressure flaking patterns. This is particularly easy to see when comparing the unfinished preforms of Clovis and Folsom points. Analysis of radiocarbon dates suggests that the Haskett Projectile Point is contemporary with Clovis and Folsom points.

== Type description ==
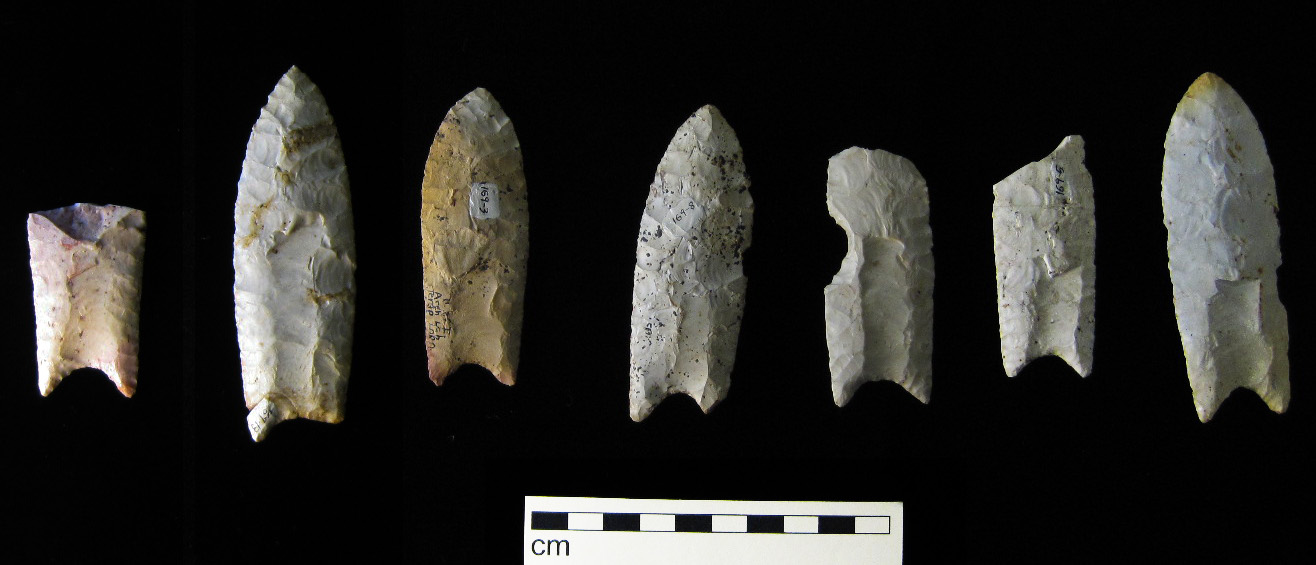
Clovis points from the Rummells-Maske Cache Site, Iowa

Only a few recovered Clovis points are in their original condition. Most points were "reworked" to resharpen them or repair damage. This can make it difficult to identify which lithic tradition they come from.

Clovis type description:

- Clovis is a comparatively large and heavy bifacially flaked fluted lanceolate point, lenticular to near oval in cross-section with parallel to moderately convex lateral edges, a majority having the latter.
- Maximum width is usually at or slightly below midpoint, frequently resulting in rather long sharp tips.
- Bases are normally only slightly concave, the depth usually ranging from 1 to 4 mm (0.039 to 0.157 in) and arching completely across basal width.
- Basal corners range from nearly square to slightly rounded without forming eared projections.
- Length range is considerable, with a majority between 75 and 110 mm (3.0 and 4.3 in).
- Maximum width range is 25 to 50 mm (0.98 to 1.97 in), a majority near the former.
- Maximum thickness range, 5 to 10 mm (0.20 to 0.39 in).
- Normally fluted on both faces.
- Flutes are most often produced by multiple flake removals
- Length and quality of flutes is greatly variable, with length usually 30% to 50% of overall point length, and the majority near the former
- Base of flutes is often widened by subsequent removals of additional channel flakes or short wide flakes.
- There is minimal post-fluting retouch of basal areas.
- Overall flaking frequently irregular in both size and orientation, often including large facet remnants of early stage reduction processes
- There is very moderate evidence of pressure flaking
- Lower lateral and basal edges are smoothed by grinding, often resulting in slight tapering of base.
- Clovis points do not have recurved (fishtail) lateral edges, pronounced basal constrictions, or convex (Folsom-type) channel flake platform remnants.

Points generally weigh between roughly 25 grams and 35 grams. Specimens are known to have been made of flint, chert, jasper, chalcedony and other stone of conchoidal fracture. Quartz crystal were also used and those points tend to be smaller. Clovis points can vary even at a single site. The eight points found at Naco, while otherwise similar, ranged in length from 2 to 4 inches. A study suggested that Clovis points east of the Mississippi river had more diversity/richness than those in the west. Points found in North Carolina also suggest there were regional variations.

== Distribution ==
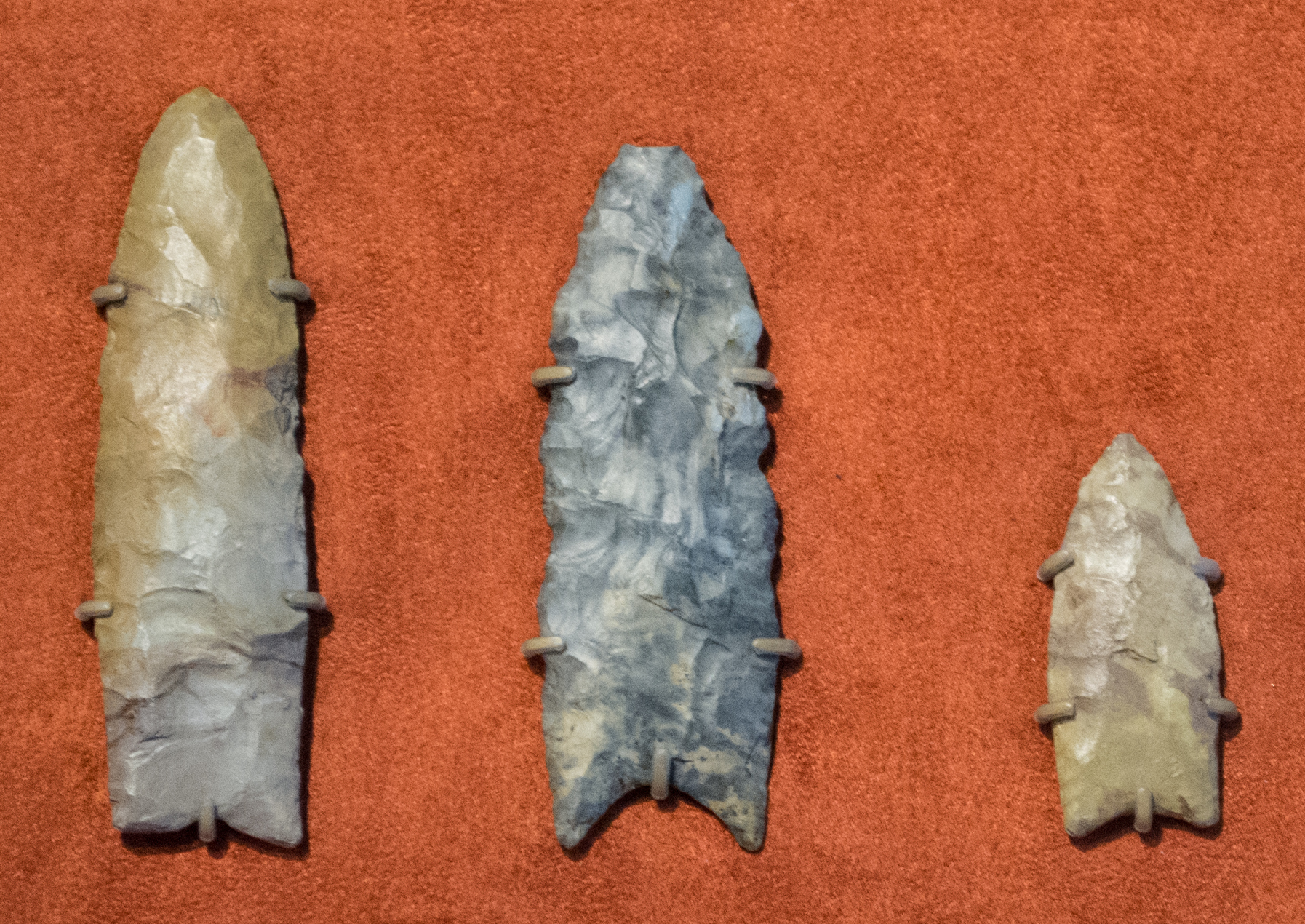
Clovis points collected in 1807 at Bone Lick, Kentucky

Clovis points have been found over most of North America and, less commonly, as far south as Venezuela. One issue is that the sea level is now about 50 meters higher than in the Paleoindian period so any coastal sites would be underwater, which may be skewing the data. The widespread South American Fishtail or Fell projectile point style has been suggested to have derived from Clovis. Of the around 6000 points currently classified as Clovis found in the United States the majority were east of the Mississippi and especially in the Southeast. Some researchers suggest that many of the eastern points are misclassified and most real Clovis Points are found in the west. Significant Clovis find sites include:

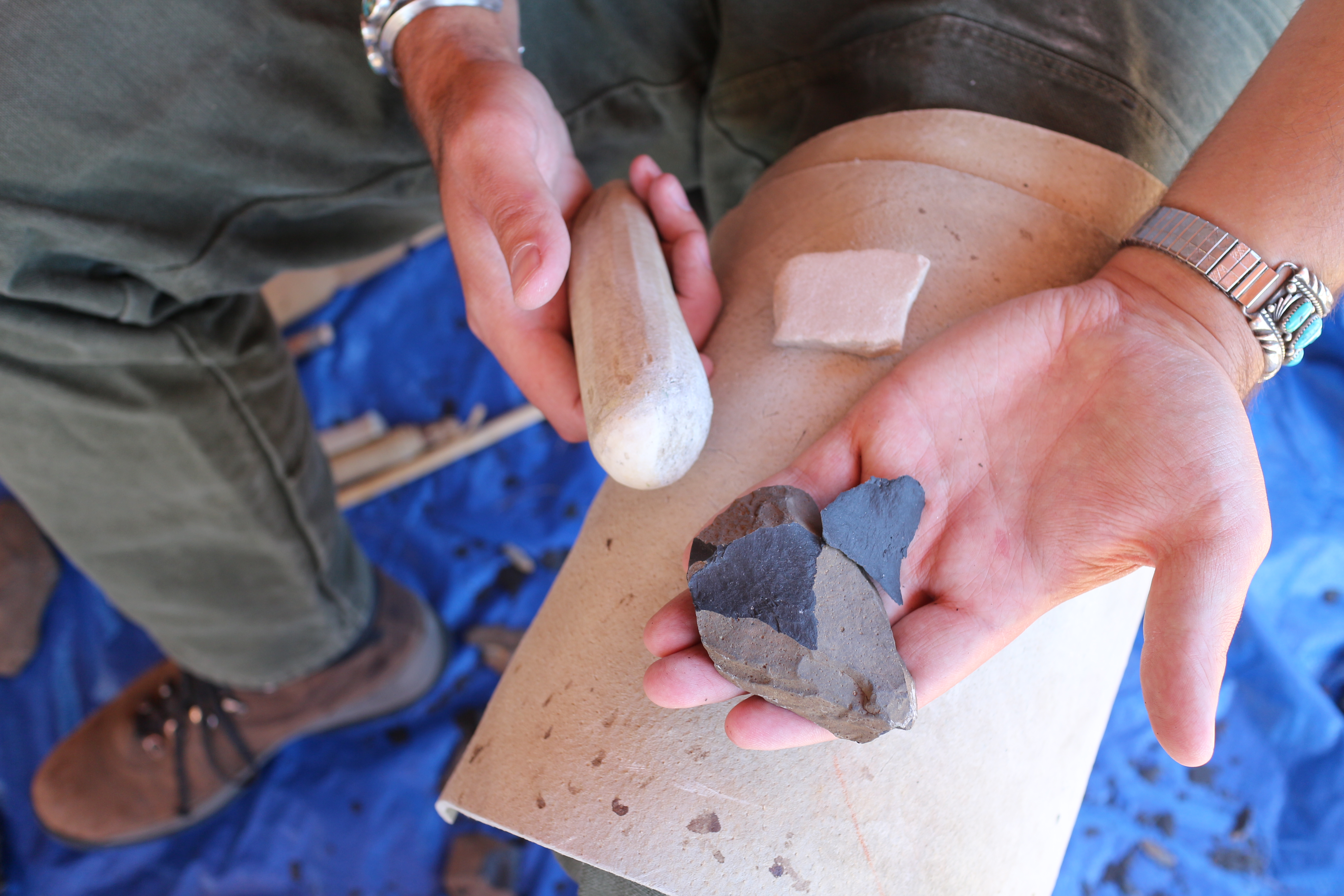
Flint-knapping demonstration

- Anzick site in Montana
- Aubrey site in Texas
- Belson site
- Big Bone Lick State Park in Kentucky
- Big Eddy Site in Missouri
- Blackwater Draw type site in New Mexico
- Cactus Hill in Virginia
- Colby site in Wyoming
- Dent site in Colorado
- Domebo Canyon in Oklahoma
- East Wenatchee Clovis Site in Washington
- El Fin del Mundo in Sonora, Mexico
- Gault site in Texas
- Page–Ladson in Florida
- Lehner Mammoth-Kill Site in Arizona
- Mockingbird Gap site
- Murray Springs Clovis Site in Arizona
- Naco Mammoth Kill Site in Arizona
- Paleo Crossing site in Ohio
- Ready site (aka Lincoln Hills site) in Illinois
- Shawnee-Minisink Site in Pennsylvania
- Simon site in Idaho
- Sloth Hole in Florida

Fraudulent Clovis points have also emerged on the open market, some with false documentation.

=== Caches ===
DeGraffenried Clovis Cache

Clovis points, along with other stone and bone/ivory tools, have been identified in over two dozen artifact caches. These caches range from the Mississippi River to the Rocky Mountains and Northwest United States. While the Anzick cache is associated with a child burial, the majority of caches appear to represent anticipatory material storage at strategic locations on the Pleistocene landscape. In May 2008, a major Clovis cache, now called the Mahaffey Cache, was found in Boulder, Colorado, with 83 Clovis stone tools though no actual Clovis Points. The tools were found to have traces of horse and cameloid protein. They were dated to 13,000 to 13,500 YBP, a date confirmed by sediment layers in which the tools were found and the types of protein residues found on the artifacts. The Fenn cache is an important collection of 56 items of uncertain provenance but that was probably discovered in 1902 "near the area where Utah, Wyoming, and Idaho meet" and was acquired by Forrest Fenn in 1988.

There is current debate on whether "assemblages", production debris typically found in Clovis sites (blade cores, large bifacial overface flakes, etc.) but without actual projectile points, actually date to the Clovis period or to later periods.

== Origins ==
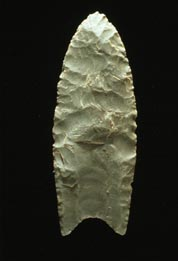
A Clovis projectile point made by bifacial percussion flaking (that is, each face is flaked on both edges alternatively.

Whether Clovis toolmaking technology was developed in the Americas in response to megafauna hunting or originated through influences from elsewhere is an open question among archaeologists. Lithic antecedents of Clovis points have not been found in northeast Asia, from where the first human inhabitants of the Americas originated in the current consensus of archaeology. Some archaeologists have argued that similarities between points produced by the Solutrean culture in the Iberian Peninsula of Europe suggest that the technology was introduced by hunters traversing the Atlantic ice-shelf and suggests that some of the first American humans were European (the Solutrean hypothesis). However, this hypothesis is not well-accepted as other archaeologists have pointed out that Solutrean and Clovis lithic technologies are technologically distinct (e.g. a lack of distinctive flutes in Solutrean technology), there is no genetic evidence for European ancestry in Indigenous North Americans, and the proposed Solutrean migration route was likely unsuitable.

== See also ==
- Barnes projectile point
- Beaver Lake point
- Cascade point
- Cumberland point
- Eden point
- Golondrina point
- Goshen point
- Plainview point
- Plano point
- Simpson point
- Suwannee point
- East Wenatchee Clovis Site
