= Suwanee =

Suwanee or Suwannee may refer to:

- Suwanee, Georgia, a city
- Suwanee, Kentucky
- USS Suwanee
- Suwanee point, a Paleo-Indian projectile point
- Suwannee Canal, alternatively spelled Suwanee Canel
- Suwannee River, Suwanee being an alternative spelling of the Suwannee River
  - Suwanee River Route
- Suwannee Limestone, Oligocene geologic formation in North Florida, United States
- Suwanee County, Florida

== See also ==
- Suwannee (disambiguation)
- Sewanee (disambiguation)
- Swanee (disambiguation)
