= Mockingbird Gap site =

Archaeological site in New Mexico, USA

Mockingbird Gap Site
- Location within New Mexico
- 33.5°N 106.5°W
- Type: archeological site
- Cultures: Clovis
- Location: Jornada del Muerto, New Mexico

Site notes
- Excavation dates: 1966-1968, 2005-2007, 2022-present
- Archaeologists: Robert H. Weber, George Agogino, Bruce Huckell, Vance Holliday, Briggs Buchanan
- Owner: Public
- Public access: Yes

The Mockingbird Gap site (LA 26748) is an archaeological site in the U.S. state of New Mexico about 50 miles southeast of the town of modern town of Socorro and about 30 kilometers east of the present course of the Rio Grande. The Mockingbird Gap itself covers about 250 square miles in eastern Socorro and western Lincoln Counties. It lies along the Chupadera Draw of the Jornada del Muerto and overlooks the Trinity Atomic Bomb site. The Mockingbird Gap site represents a large Clovis culture occupation, possibly a camp used for large animal hunting (bison have been suggested).

== Archaeology ==
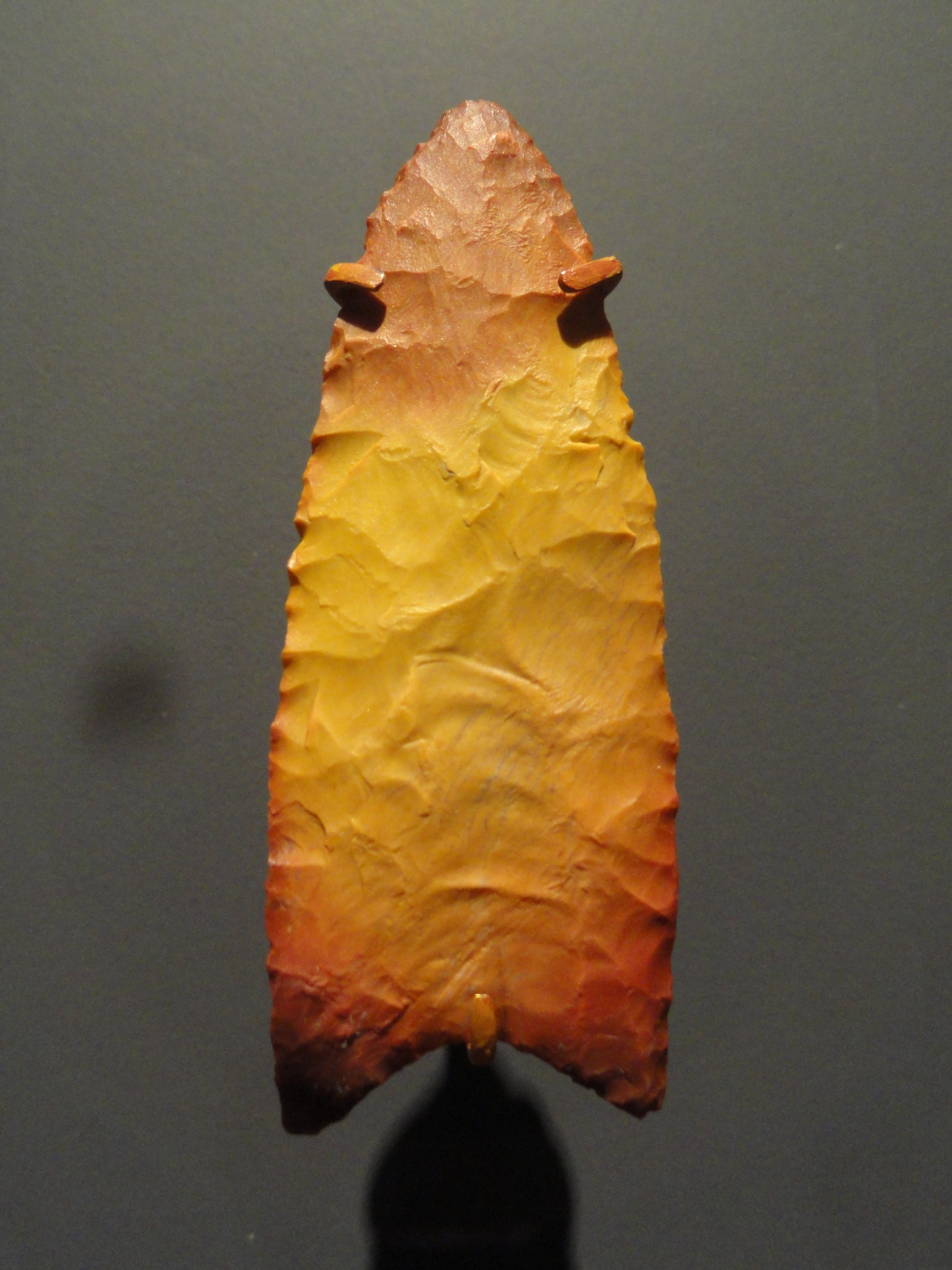
Clovis point, 11500–9000 BC, Sevier County, Utah, chert

The archaeology of Mockingbird Gap was first noted by Robert H. Weber in the 1950s. He continued the work of noting archaeological remains in the Gap until 2008. He found at least 70 Clovis projectile points in the Mackingbird Gap outside the area of the site. The Mockingbird Gap site itself. about 0.5 square kilometers in extent, was first excavated from 1966 until 1968 by George Agogino of Eastern New Mexico University, working with Weber. An area of about 87 square meters was excavated revealing remains from Clovis, Archaic, late Prehistoric, and early Historic period Ancestral Pueblo periods. Occupation material extended about 1 meter deep.

From 2005 to 2007 a [[University of New Mexico]] and University of Arizona team led by Bruce Huckell and Vance Holliday excavated at the site. Work including deep coring. In 2022 work resumed at the site by a team led by Briggs Buchanan. Operations focused on surveys, documentation of finds, and geophysical sensing. During the initial complete surface survey on 5 diagnostic specimens were recovered indicating the site is geomorphically stable.

Clovis period finds recovered so far include "more than 200 projectile points (mostly basal fragments), 100 gravers, 50 end scrapers, numerous unifacially retouched flakes, and abundant utilized flakes and debitag". About 27 projectile points are complete. The most common stone used for tools is jasper followed by chalcedony and obsidian. In a core drilled in 2008 a calcium carbonate bead was found at a depth between 910 and 920 centimeters below the surface. It was manufactured using a rotary drill and dated to about 11,000 C^{14} years BP, the Clovis period though it was suggested that it might belong to the slightly later Folsom tradition.

== See also ==
- Archaeology of the Americas
- Cooper's Ferry site
- East Wenatchee Clovis Site
- Folsom point
- Gault site
- La Prele Mammoth Site
- Rimrock Draw Rockshelter
