= Vance T. Holliday =

American scientist (born 1950)

Vance T. Holliday (born 1950) is a professor in the School of Anthropology and the department of Geosciences as well as an adjunct professor in the department of Geography at the University of Arizona in Tucson.

Holliday's research interests include geoarchaeology, Paleoindian archaeology, soil-geomorphology as well as Quaternary landscape evolution and paleoenvironment with a current emphasis on the Southwestern United States and Northwest Mexico. Prior research areas have included the Great Plains as well as Paleolithic sites in southwestern Russia.

Holliday currently serves as the executive director of the Argonaut Archaeological Research Fund (AARF) based in the School of Anthropology at the University of Arizona. His most recent research, outlined in a 2011 Journal of Field Archaeology article, has focused on understanding the Paleoindian occupation around large paleo-lakes in the Southern landscape at the end of the Pleistocene.

== Background ==
After graduating from Winston Churchill High School in San Antonio, Texas Holliday began his undergraduate education at a local junior college where he studied architecture. During his sophomore year Holliday transferred to the University of Texas at Austin where he earned a Bachelor of Arts (B.A.) with Honors in Anthropology (1972). Holliday went on to earn a Master of Art (M.A.)in Museum Science from Texas Tech University (1977).

As an undergraduate Holliday's main interest was Texas archaeology. He performed extensive field experience as an employee of the Texas Archeological Salvage Project Holliday's archaeological interests soon shifted to soils, landscapes and geoarchaeology. He obtained a Ph.D. in Geology from the University of Colorado at Boulder (1982).

During his time at Texas Tech, Holliday worked closely with Dr. Eileen Johnson of the Museum of Texas Tech University on the Lubbock Lake Project located in Northwestern Texas. One of the most notable findings at the Lubbock Site is the discovery of cultural features which span the Paleo-Indian period. Holliday has written several journal articles on the Lubbock Site focusing on inventorying and describing Plainview complex material located at the kill/butchery locales detailing the dating of the Plainview occupation at the site; as well as discussing multiple camping occasions and activities of the Paleo-Indians at the area.

In 1984, after completion of his Ph.D., Holliday accepted a position as visiting professor and assistant professor at Texas A&M University. The theme of Holliday's journal articles began to heavily focus on the soil and geologic make-up of the Lubbock Lake Site, based on his Ph.D. dissertation. Some of Holliday's later journal articles included discussing the archaeological geology and early Holocene soils at the site; as well as the stratigraphy found at Lubbock In addition to these journal articles Holliday also focused some of his writings on the lithics found at the site. Holliday found Lubbock Lake valuable for from the many lasting records of plant and animal communities, geology, climate and human activities available at the site.

In 1986, Holliday joined the University of Wisconsin at Madison in the Geography department, where he remained until 2002. During this time, many of his journal articles focused on other sites and geo-archaeological and Quaternary geologic aspects of the southern Great Plains area. Holliday received several National Science Foundation grants to investigate aspects of the late Quaternary landscape evolution of the Southern High Plains. Holliday also pursued his interests in Paleoindian archaeology. This resulted in a series of papers on late Quaternary stratigraphy, paleoenvironments and Paleoindian geo-archaeology.

This series of papers resulted in Holliday's 1995 Geological Society of America book, Stratigraphy and Paleoenvironments of Late Quaternary Valley Fills, as well as his 1997 book titled Paleoindian Geoarchaeology of the Southern High Plains. Holliday also devoted some of time to the application of his ideas on using soils in geoarchaeological research, on which he wrote a book, Soils in Archaeological Research, which was published in 2004 after arriving at the University of Arizona.

Since 2002 Holliday has been a professor in both the School of Anthropology and Department of Geosciences as well as an adjunct professor in the department of Geography at the University of Arizona at Tucson.

In 2002 Holliday also accepted the position of executive director of the Argonaut Archaeological Research Fund (AARF), a long-term research program focused on the earliest peopling of the Southwest U.S. and northwestern Mexico. Since the establishment of AARF, Holliday has been involved in many site excavations in the southwest, more specifically in Mexico and New Mexico. The Mockingbird Gap site discovered in the 1950s southeast of Socorro, New Mexico is described as “one of the largest and perhaps least known Clovis sites in the southwestern United States.” Initial excavations revealed hundreds of Clovis artifacts such as projectile point bases, fluted point preforms and gravers from an area 800 meters by 80–150 meters. A 2004 visit led the Holliday and collaborator B.B. Huckell (University of New Mexico) to believe there was more to be learned from the site about Clovis occupation and in 2005 excavations began which continued throughout the 2006 and 2007 field seasons. Their initial beliefs were validated when results of these excavations show significant Clovis age deposits at the site.

Research with B.B. Huckell was also carried out at several Folsom sites on the West Mesa area of the Albuquerque Basin. The work documented the spatial patterning of paleoenvironmental context of Folsom occupations around several small lake basins. :In Sonora, field work in collaboration with M.G.Sanchez (INAH) focused on a series of Clovis sites, most prominently an in-situ Clovis/Gomphothere kill site and an extensive camping area on the adjacent uplands.

Holliday has conducted research and field work in many locations across the southwest United States, Argentina and in the Don River Valley of Russia. He has written and/or edited five books as well as authored or co-authored over 50 reviewed book and journal articles as well as another 200 articles and book chapters.

== Awards and honors ==
Holliday has been the recipient of several notable professional awards including the 1998 Kirk Bryan Award of the Geological Society of America for Stratigraphy and Paleoenvironments of Late Quaternary Valley Fills on the Southern High Plains (1995); 1998 George R. “Rip” Rapp Archaeological Geology Career Award of the Geological Society of America.36 Holliday was also elected Fellow of the Geological Society of America in 1992 as well as being an invited organizer of the First Annual Fryxell Symposium on Earth Science in Archaeology for the American Society of Archaeology in 1988 and was an invited participant in a symposium honoring the 50th anniversary publication of Hans Jenny’s Factors of Soil Formation at the Soil Science Society of America annual meeting in 1991.

Holliday has been the recipient of multiple grants from organizations such as the National Geographic Society, the National Science Foundation, the University of Wisconsin Graduate School, and the U.S. Department of Agriculture.

== Key excavations ==
Holliday has led or participated in numerous projects over his professional career beginning with weekend digs around Austin, Texas with the University of Texas. After graduation in December 1972 Holliday's part-time job with the Texas Archaeological Salvage Project became full-time. This was in the earliest days of CRM archaeology and Holliday spent his days making maps and other report illustrations eventually working his way up to a field archaeologist. During this time Holliday worked in East Texas, the Edwards Plateau of Central Texas, along the Texas coast as well as in the deserts of West Texas and in the High Plains. In 1973 Holliday began work as a volunteer on the Lubbock Lake site where he later began research in 1974. As Holliday began his Ph.D. studies, he began focusing on geoarchaeology and Paleoindian archaeology on the Great Plains. The sites he worked on during this time included Clovis (Blackwater Draw), Plainview, Midland, Mustang Springs, Lipscomb, Miami, San Jon, Folsom, Lindenmeier, and Dent site. During Holliday's professional career he also worked on Holocene sites on the Argentine Pampas and Kostenki localities in Russia. Since 2002, Holliday's research has shifted to the southwest U.S. and northwest Mexico. Holliday has been involved on projects in Arizona, New Mexico, Sonora (as part of AARF) and also a participant in fieldwork in Montana and Alaska.

== Research emphasis ==
While Holliday's academic background is in Archaeology, Geology and Soil Science, he spent 17 years of his professional career focusing on Geography. The combination of these intersecting interests and experiences has fostered a career devoted to reconstructing landscapes and environments where ancient human populations have lived. More specifically Holliday's current research emphasis includes: 1. Using the geosciences to answer archaeological questions (geoarchaeology); 2. The early peopling of the Southwest and Great Plains, and the landscape evolution and environments of the late Quaternary in these regions; 3. The use of soils as indicators of the past.

== Selected publications ==
=== Books ===
- Holliday, V.T. (1995) Stratigraphy and Paleoenvironments of Late Quaternary Valley Fills on the Southern High Plains. Geological Society of America Memoir 186.
- Holliday, V.T. (1997) Paleoindian Geoarchaeology of the Southern High Plains. University of Texas Press, Austin.
- A.K.L. Freeman and V.T. Holliday, Eds., 2000. “North American Geoarchaeology: Dedicated to C. Vance Haynes, Jr.” Geoarchaeology v. 15 no. 6
- P. Goldberg, V. T. Holliday, and C. R. Ferring (Editors), 2001. Earth Science in Archaeology, Kluwer Academic/ Plenum Publishers, 513 p.
- Holliday, V.T. (2004) Soils in Archaeological Research. Oxford University Press, Oxford, UK.

=== Articles and book chapters ===
- Late Cenozoic Paleoenvironments of the Llano Estacado. In Press. Vance T. Holliday and E. Johnson, edited by J. Lee. Book chapter for Physical Geography of the Llano Estacado. Texas Tech University Press.
- A Terminal Pleistocene Child Cremation and Residential Structure from Eastern Beringia. 2011. Ben A. Potter, Joel D. Irish, Joshua D. Reuther, Carol Gelvin-Reymiller, Vance T. Holliday. Science, 331: 1058–1062.
- The 12.9k Impact Hypothesis and North American Paleoindians. 2010. Vance T. Holliday and David J. Meltzer. Current Anthropology, 51: 575–585.
- Geoarchaeology and the Search for the First Americans. 2009. Vance T. Holliday. Cantena, 79: 310–322.
- Geoarchaeology of the Mockingbird Gap (Clovis) Site, Jomada del Muerto, New Mexico. 2009. Vance T. Holliday, Bruce B. Huckell, Marcus Hamilton, Robert H. Weber, William R. Reitze and James H. Mayer. Geoarchaeology, 24: 438–370
- Geochronology and Stratigraphy of Playa Fills on the Southern High Plains. 2008. Vance T. Holliday, James H. Mayer and Glen Fredlund. Quaternary Research, 70: 11–25.
- Geoarchaeology of the Kostenki-Borshchevo Sites, Don River, Russia. 2007. Geoarchaeology, 22: 181–228.
- Soil Phosphorus and Archaeology: A Review and Comparison of Methods. 2007. Journal of Archaeological Science, 34: 301–333.
- Paleoindian Geoarchaeology of the Great Plains, Central Lowlands, and Southwestern U.S. 2006. Book Chapter for Environment, Origins, and Populations, Volume 3 of the Handbook of North American Indians, edited by D. Stanford. Smithsonian Institution Press, p. 23-26.
- A History of Soil Geomorphology in the United States. 2006. Footprints in the Soil: People and Ideas in Soil History, edited by B.P. Warkenton. Elsevier Press, p. 187-254.
- Ice Age Peopling of New Mexico. 2005. New Mexico's Ice Ages, edited by S.G. Lucas, G.S. Morgan, and K.E.Zeigler. New Mexico Museum of Natural History and Science. Bulletin 28, p. 263-276.
- Quaternary Geoscience in Archaeology. 2001. Earth Science in Archaeology, edited P. Goldberg, V.T. Holliday, and C.R. Ferring. pp. 3–35. Kluwer Academic/Plenum Publishers, New York.
- AMS Radiocarbon Dating of the Type Plainview and Firstview (Paleoindian) Assemblages. 1999. American Antiquity 64:622-634. Holliday, Vance T., Johnson, Eileen., and Stafford Jr. Thomas W.
- Geoarchaeology of the Midland (Paleoindian) Site, Texas. 1996. American Antiquity 61: 755–771. Holliday, Vance T. and Meltzer, David J.
- Geoarchaeology and Geochronology of the Miami (Clovis) Site, Southern High Plains. 1994. Quaternary Research 41:234-244. Holliday, Vance T., Haynes, C. Vance., Hofman, Jack L., and Meltzer, David J.
- Soil Formation, Time and Archaeology. 1992. Soils in Archaeology: Landscape Evolution and Human Occupation, edited by V.T. Holliday, pp. 107–117. Holliday, Vance T. Smithsonian Institution Press, Washington, D.C.
- Geology and Soils. 1987. Lubbock Lake: Late Quaternary Studies on the Southern High Plains, edited by Eileen Johnson, pp. 14–21. Holliday, Vance T. and Allen, B.L. Texas A&M University Press, College Station
- Re-evaluation of the First Radiocarbon Age for the Folsom Culture. 1986. American Antiquity 51: 332–338. Holliday, Vance T. and Johnson, Eileen. Early Holocene Soils at the Lubbock Lake Archaeological Site, Texas. 1985. Catena 12:61-78. Holliday, Vance T.
