= Suwannee =

Suwannee may refer to:

- Suwannee, Florida, a town in Dixie County
- Suwannee County, Florida
- Suwannee River
- USS Suwannee (CVE-27)
- Suwannee point, projectile point

== See also ==
- Suwanee (disambiguation)
- Sewanee (disambiguation)
- Swanee (disambiguation)
