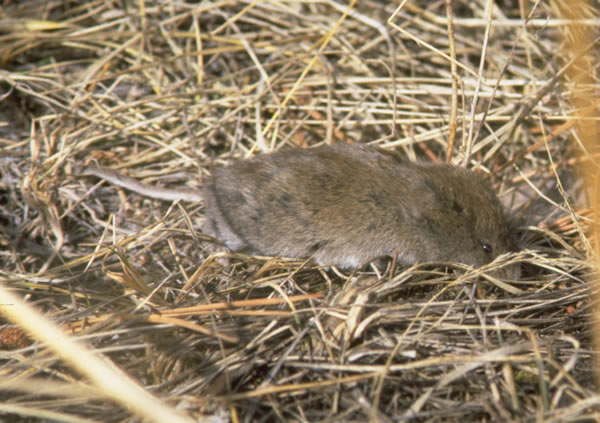

Conservation status
- Least Concern (IUCN 3.1)

Scientific classification
- Kingdom: Animalia
- Phylum: Chordata
- Class: Mammalia
- Order: Rodentia
- Family: Cricetidae
- Subfamily: Arvicolinae
- Genus: Microtus
- Subgenus: Mynomes
- Species: M. longicaudus

Binomial name
- Microtus longicaudus (Merriam, 1888)

Subspecies
- List: M. l. abditus A. B. Howell, 1923; M. l. alticola Merriam, 1890; M. l. angusticeps Bailey, 1898; M. l. angustus Hall, 1931; M. l. baileyi Goldman, 1938; M. l. bernardinus Merriam, 1908; M. l. cautus J. A. Allen, 1899; M. l. coronarius Swarth, 1911; M. l. halli Hayman and Holt, 1941; M. l. incanus Lee and Durrant, 1960; M. l. latus Hall, 1931; M. l. leucophaeus J. A. Allen, 1894; M. l. littoralis Swarth, 1933; M. l. macrurus Merriam, 1898; M. l. mordax Merriam, 1891; M. l. sierrae Kellogg, 1922; M. l. vellerosus J. A. Allen, 1899
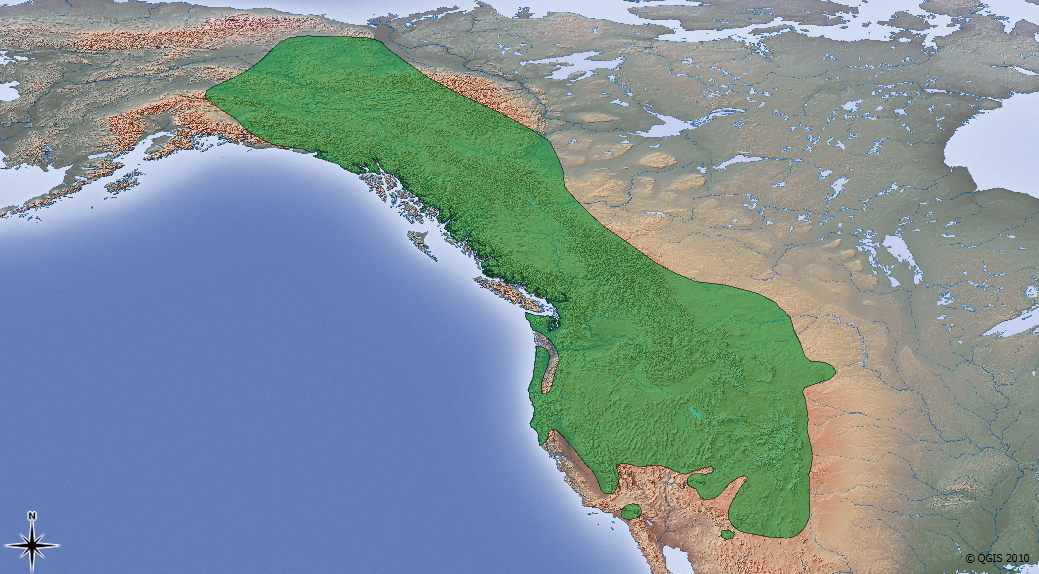
- Distribution of the long-tailed vole

Synonyms
- List: Arvicola (Mynomes) longicaudus Merriam, 1888; Arvicola (Mynomes) alticolus Merriam, 1890; Arvicola (Mynomes) mordax Merriam, 1891; Arvicola leucophaeus Allen, 1894; Microtus angusticeps Bailey, 1898; Microtus macrurus Merriam, 1898; Microtus vellerosus Allen, 1899; Microtus cautus Allen 1899

= Long-tailed vole =

Species of rodent

The long-tailed vole (Microtus longicaudus), in some areas known as the San Bernardino long-tailed vole, is a small vole found in western North America. They have short ears and a long tail. Their fur is gray brown with light gray underparts. They are around 18 cm (7.1 in) long with an 8 cm (3.1 in) tail and weigh about 50 g (1.8 oz).

== Taxonomy ==
The scientific name of the long-tailed vole is Microtus longicaudus. The generic name, Microtus, derives from the Greek words μικρός meaning "small" + οὖς "ear". In Latin, the species name longicaudus derives from longus meaning "long" and cauda meaning "tail". The type specimen was a female collected by Vernon Orlando Bailey in the Black Hills at an altitude around 5,500 ft (1,700 m) near Custer, South Dakota, on July 19, 1887. The description was published by C. Hart Merriam in The American Naturalist the following year. The original scientific name was Arvicola longicaudus. Certain features of the molars were noted, which distinguished the long-tailed vole from other voles known at the time. The species was formerly sometimes regarded as a member of the Old World genus Chionomys.

The Coronation Island vole, once considered to be a separate species, is now believed to be a subspecies.

== Description ==
The long-tailed vole is a small terrestrial mammal. They are around 18 cm (7.1 in) long with an 8 cm (3.1 in) tail. They weigh on average 50 g (1.8 oz). They have a thick body and a relatively long tail. The tail is bicolored and extends greater than one-third the animal's total length. The type specimen measured 185 mm (7.3 in), with a 65 millimetres (2.6 in) tail and a 21 millimetres (0.83 in) hind foot. The ear measured 14 millimetres (0.55 in) x 8 millimetres (0.31 in) x 13 millimetres (0.51 in).

The long-tailed vole is similar in size to the meadow vole (Microtus pennsylvanicus). However, it has a longer tail, bigger ears, and grayer coat. In addition, the skull is flatter, and the cranium is wider.

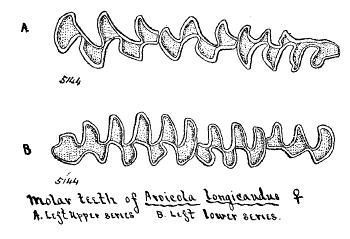
Left upper and lower molar teeth

The middle upper molar lacks a posterior-internal loop or spur. Merriam also noted some "peculiarities", not otherwise specified, in the original description, which distinguish the long-tailed vole from other species known in the late 1800s. This first specimen Merriam described had large ears, with folds capable of closing the ear canal opening. Relative to the overall length of the animal, the tail was longer than any other vole described at that time. The fur is a sooty yellow-brown with some grizzled aspects. There are hints of rust coloring on the mid back. The whitish underside fur is a leaden gray towards the base. The underside fur blends seamlessly with the fur on the sides of the vole. The undersides of the tail are darker. The feet are plumbeous, a leaden gray.

The genitalia of the long-tailed vole have been described. The baculum has broad and straight proximal bone. It is similar in structure to that of the meadow vole, but with different proportions. The basal shaft is dumb-bell shaped in cross section and tapers to a blunt point at the end. The shaft is broad in dimension and connects via cartilaginous linkages to three lateral segments. The glans penis has a dorsal lobe elevated above a ventral rim. The rim has spiny fingerlike processes, but not the dorsal lobe. A rod shaped os clitoridis may be present, in front of the urethra.

Long-tailed voles can be found with unusual dentition. A female with grooved incisors was found in the Yukon. Several other voles from Oregon were found with flattened incisors and malocclusion of their incisors and molars. A specimen in New Mexico was reported with an extra tooth in the right lower jaw. An albino vole was also found in New Mexico.

Long-tailed voles do not usually have the hip glands, which are found in other members of the genus Microtus. These can develop if the animal is injected with testosterone. Each eyelid of the long-tailed vole has around 3-4 meibomian glands.

=== Fossil record ===
Fossil remains date towards the end of the Wisconsinian glaciation. Fossils have been collected from: Moonshiner Cave in Idaho; Agate Basin and Little Box Elder Cave in Wyoming; Chimney Rock Animal Trap in Colorado; and Burnet Cave and Dry Cave in New Mexico. The fossil remains of long-tailed voles may be difficult to distinguish from those of similar small voles, such as the meadow vole and the montane vole. As such, collected fossils are identified based on probabilities of occurrence within the geographic range or with other associated species.

== Distribution and habitat ==
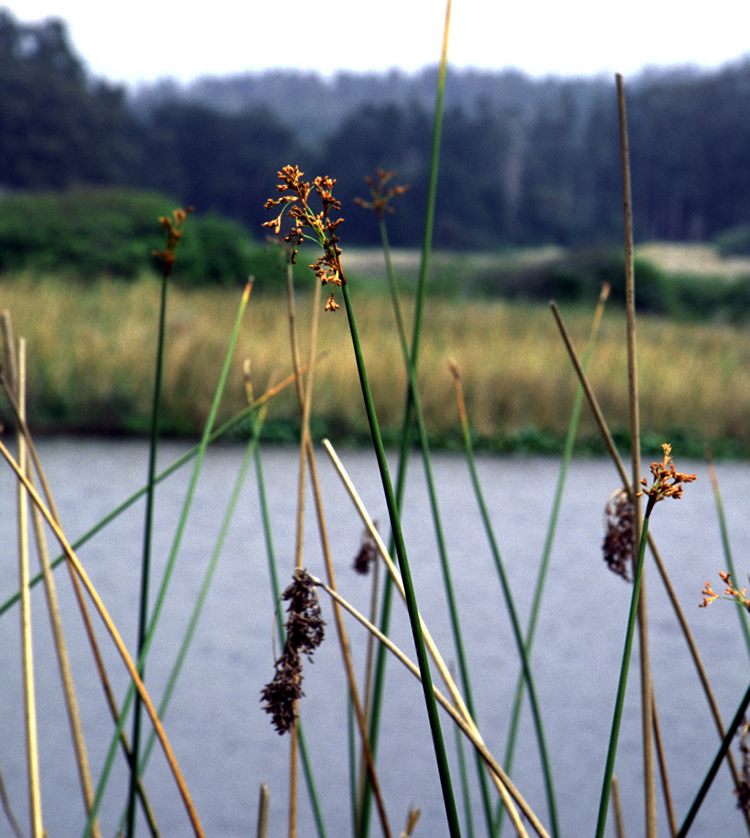
Long-tailed voles may reside near marshes growing hardstem bullrush (Schoenoplectus acutus)

These animals are found in a wide variety of habitats, including alpine meadows and shrubby areas, often near streams. They may live in dense forests of conifers or in more arid, sagebrush type of habitats. They are common in areas of disturbed habitat, including areas of recent fire, deforestation, or mining. In Alaska, they do well in areas where clear-cuts have been taken. In the Yukon, they are found among spruce forests and where buffaloberry grow.

In the Malheur National Wildlife Refuge, they reside among marshes of hardstem bullrush (Schoenoplectus acutus), cattail (Typha latifolia), baltic rush (Juncus balticus), and sedges (Carex sp.).

They are found at elevations from sea level up to 3,650 m (11,980 ft) above sea level. Near the southern and eastern limits of the geographic range, they tend to reside at higher elevations. Their range extends throughout western North American. The northern limits are in east-central Alaska. The range extends south through the western Canadian provinces of Alberta, British Columbia, Northwest Territories, and Yukon. It extends south and east to include the states of: Arizona, California, Colorado, Idaho, Montana, Nevada, New Mexico, Oregon, South Dakota, Utah, Washington, Wyoming.

== Behavior and ecology ==
Long-tailed voles are active year-round, usually during the day. However, in Alaska, they have been observed nocturnally. The usually are free ranging and do not make well defined runways. The breeding season begins in May and extends through September or October, depending on location. The female vole has on average two litters per year, but may have as few as 1 or as many as 4. In northern areas, they may have only two litters over the course of their lifetime. The size of the litter is typically four or five. They may have as many as eight. Long-tailed vole parents will respond to ultrasonic cries made by the newborns in distress. It is unusual for long-tailed voles to live more than one year. Females live longer than males.

The long-tailed vole are apprehensive of other voles. They are found in areas inhabited by other microtines, but generally avoid contact. The montane vole is a more aggressive animal and is known to displace them from their habitat. The more long-tailed voles in a given area, the more aggressive the montane voles become.

They feed on green plants, assorted berries, seeds, and fungi. During the winter, diet may consist of the inner bark of shrubs and trees. During winters in Nevada, they have been observed eating bark and leaves of sagebrush.

Predators include barn owls, great horned owls, long-eared owls, and short-eared owls. Prairie falcons, peregrine falcons, red-tailed hawks and marsh hawks are also reported as predators. Known or suspected mustelid predators of the long-tailed vole include ermines, long-tailed weasels, and American pine martens.

Long-tailed vole populations can fluctuate widely over a period of time within a given locale. Populations densities are generally sparse, with around 5-16 voles per hectare, but this can increase to more than 40.

== Human interactions ==
=== Conservation status ===
The International Union for Conservation of Nature and Natural Resources (IUCN) lists the animal as least concern. Long-tailed voles are common and have a very widespread geographic distribution, with a number of protected areas within the range. They are also capable of adapting to changes in their environment as well.
