= East Wenatchee Clovis Site =

Archaeological site in Washington (state), USA

- Location within Washington (state)
- 47°24′22″N 120°12′7″W
- Type: archeological site
- Cultures: Clovis
- Location: near East Wenatchee, Washington

Site notes
- Excavation dates: 1988, 1990
- Archaeologists: Peter J. Mehringer, R. Michael Gramly
- Public access: No

The East Wenatchee Clovis Site (also called the Richey-Roberts Clovis Site or the Richey Clovis Cache), with the site designation of "45DO482", is a deposit of prehistoric Clovis points and other implements, dating to roughly 11,000 radiocarbon years before present, found near the city of East Wenatchee, Washington in 1987. Accidentally discovered on an apple farm, the site contained some of the largest known stone Clovis points. It lies just west of the Columbia River.

== Archaeology ==
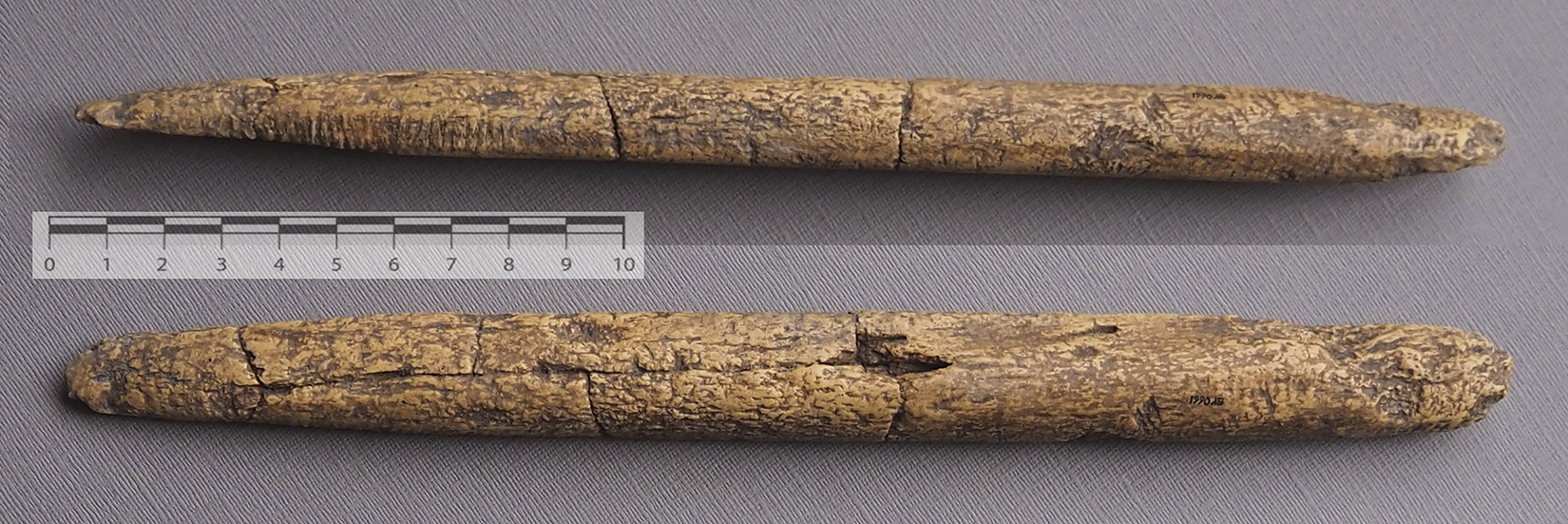
From source:Two views of a reassembled beveled bone rod or foreshaft from the East Wenatchee site

The site was accidentally uncovered on May 27, 1987 as the foreman of the orchard, Mark Mickles, and farm employee Moises Aguirre Calzada were installing an irrigation line. They unearthed 5 fluted points, 14 other stone tools, and 4 bone rods which were at first mistaken for tools left by contemporary Indian tribes. Orchard co-owner Rich Roberts and his wife Joanne later showed the items to local amateur archaeologist Russell S. Congdon, who identified them as Clovis tools and contacted archaeologist Robert Mierendorf who confirmed the identification as Clovis.

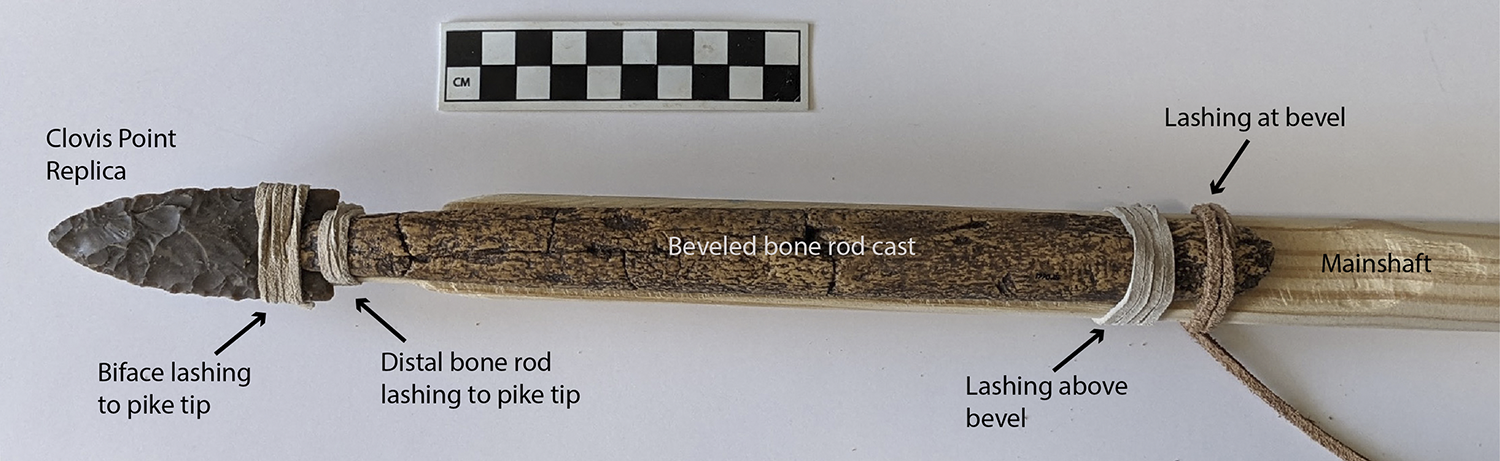
From source: Experimental splint hafted pike with replica Clovis point tip, resin cast of East Wenatchee beveled bone rod, yellow pine mainshaft and tanned buckskin strips for lashing.

An excavation in April 1988, led by Peter J. Mehringer of Washington State University with a team of experts in Paleo-Indian archaeology and members of the Confederated Tribes of the Colville Reservation, discovered 22 more stone and bone tools, but removed only five stone objects including two 23.5 centimeter long fluted Clovis bifaces. Two backhoe trenches were dug 40-625 meters north-northeast of the tool discovery location. Excavated volcanic tephra (from the Glacier Peak and Mazama eruptions) produced a date of 11,125 ± 130 ^{14}C yr B.P. (Before Present). The date is based on Glacier Peak volcanic ash adhering to Clovis artifacts.

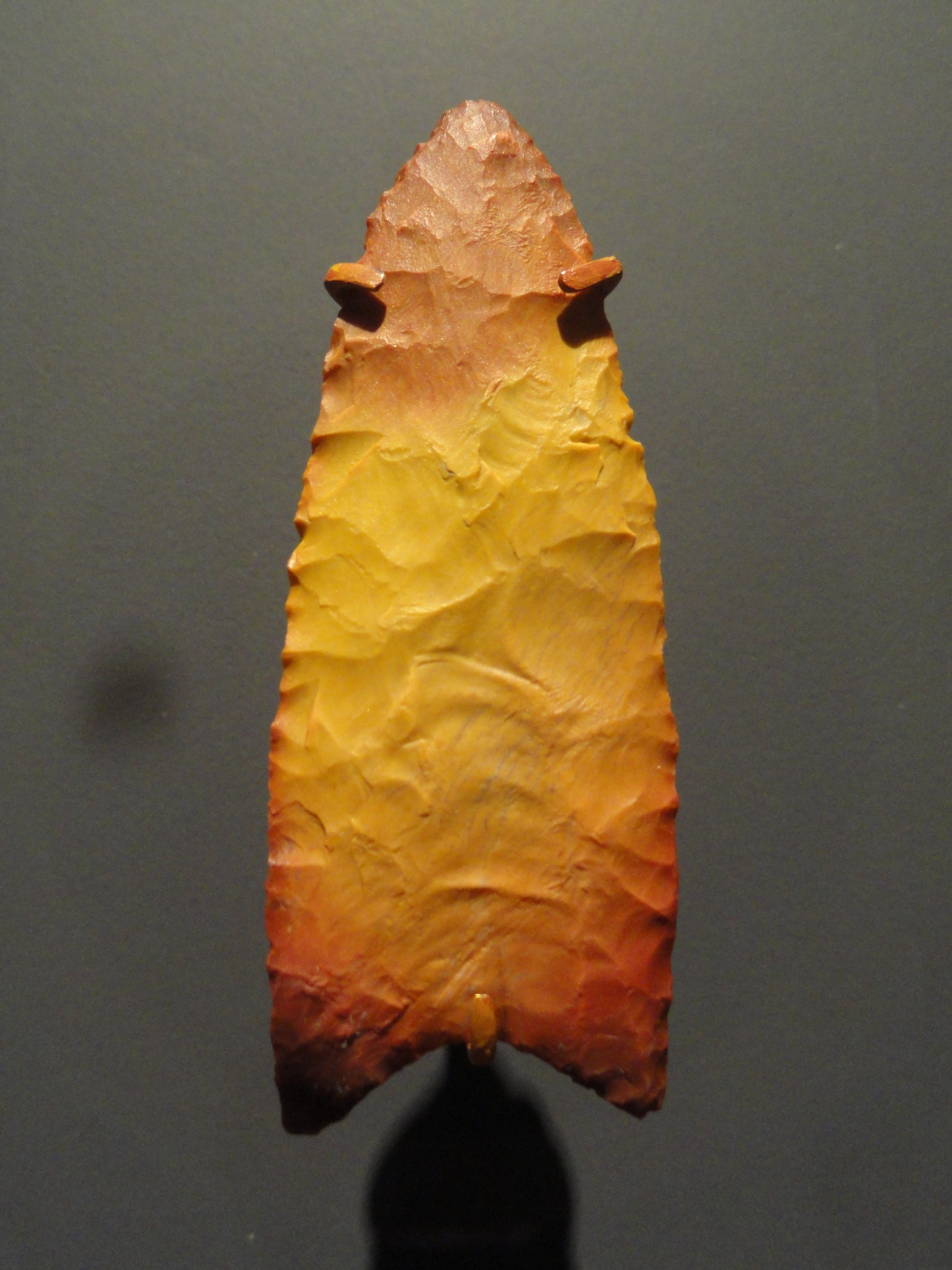
Example of a biface Clovis projectile point, from Sevier County, Utah, chert

After Mack Richey became sole owner of the site in November 1988 excavation resumed under archaeologist R. Michael Gramly of the Buffalo Museum of Science and the North Central Washington Museum of Wenatchee in October 1990. Finds included 30 bone (including 14 bi-beveled bone rods) and stone tools including a 24.5 centimeter long fluted Clovis point, at that time the largest ever found. Blood residue on 3 of the stone tools matched bison, bovine, deer, and rabbit. The bone rods were later determined to be used to haft projectile points. The methods and results of this excavation have been questioned.

In 1992, Richey donated all the recovered Clovis artifacts and sold the archaeological rights to the 35-square-meter site for $250,000 to the Washington State Historical Society, which owns them in perpetuity. The sale contract stipulated that no archaeological work could take place for 15 years after the purchase; that moratorium expired June 1, 2007, although no new scientific digging has since taken place. Richey sold the entire orchard to a new owner in 2004. At this time what was once an archaeological site was re-filled with dirt, covered with a cement slab, and restored to be part of the orchard.

The site continued to operate as a commercial apple orchard as of 2007. As researchers Ruth Kirk and Richard D. Daugherty wrote, "Despite all the care taken, certain risks to the site remain. How will orchard chemicals and irrigation water affect bone still in the ground? And what about ongoing bioturbation, the disturbance caused by roots and rodents? The site in the orchard was essentially undisturbed when its window to the past was opened, albeit slightly. It has been sampled but not fully excavated. Enigma remains."

== See also ==
- Clovis culture
- Clovis point
- Paleo-Indians
- Archaeology of the Americas
