= Sewanee =

Sewanee may refer to:

- Sewanee, Tennessee
- Sewanee: The University of the South
- The Sewanee Review, an American literary magazine established in 1892
- Sewanee Natural Bridge
- Saint Andrews-Sewanee School

== See also ==
- Suwanee (disambiguation)
- Suwannee (disambiguation)
- Swanee (disambiguation)
