= Swanee =

Swanee may refer to:

- Suwannee River, re-spelled "Swanee" by Stephen Foster to fit the rhythm in "Old Folks at Home", influencing subsequent uses of the word, such as:
  - "Swanee" (song), a song by George Gershwin and Irving Caesar, made popular by Al Jolson
  - Slide whistle, also called a swanee whistle
  - Swanee, a soft drink made by the defunct Bob's-Cola company
- Swanee (singer), the stage name of John Swan, an Australian rock singer

== See also ==
- Sewanee (disambiguation)
- Suwanee (disambiguation)
- Suwannee (disambiguation)
- Swanee River (disambiguation)
