= Gault (archaeological site) =

Pre-Clovis archaeological site in Texas

Gault archaeological site
- Location within Texas
- 30°53′032″N 97°42′35″W
- Type: archeological site
- Cultures: Clovis
- Location: Florence, Texas

Site notes
- Excavation dates: 1929, 1991, 1998-2002, 2007-2015
- Archaeologists: J. E. Pearce, Michael Collins, Thomas Hester
- Owner: Public
- Public access: Yes

The Gault archaeological site (41BL323) is an extensive, multicomponent site located in Florence, Texas, United States on the Williamson-Bell County line along Buttermilk Creek about 250 meters upstream from the Buttermilk Creek complex. It bears evidence of human habitation spanning from over 14,000 years ago, making it one of the few archaeological sites in the Americas at which compelling evidence has been found for human occupation dating to before the appearance of the Clovis culture. Archaeological material covers about 16 hectares with a depth of up to 3 meters in places. About 30 incised stones from the Clovis period engraved with geometric patterns were found there as well as others from periods up to the Early Archaic. Incised bone was also found.

== Significance ==
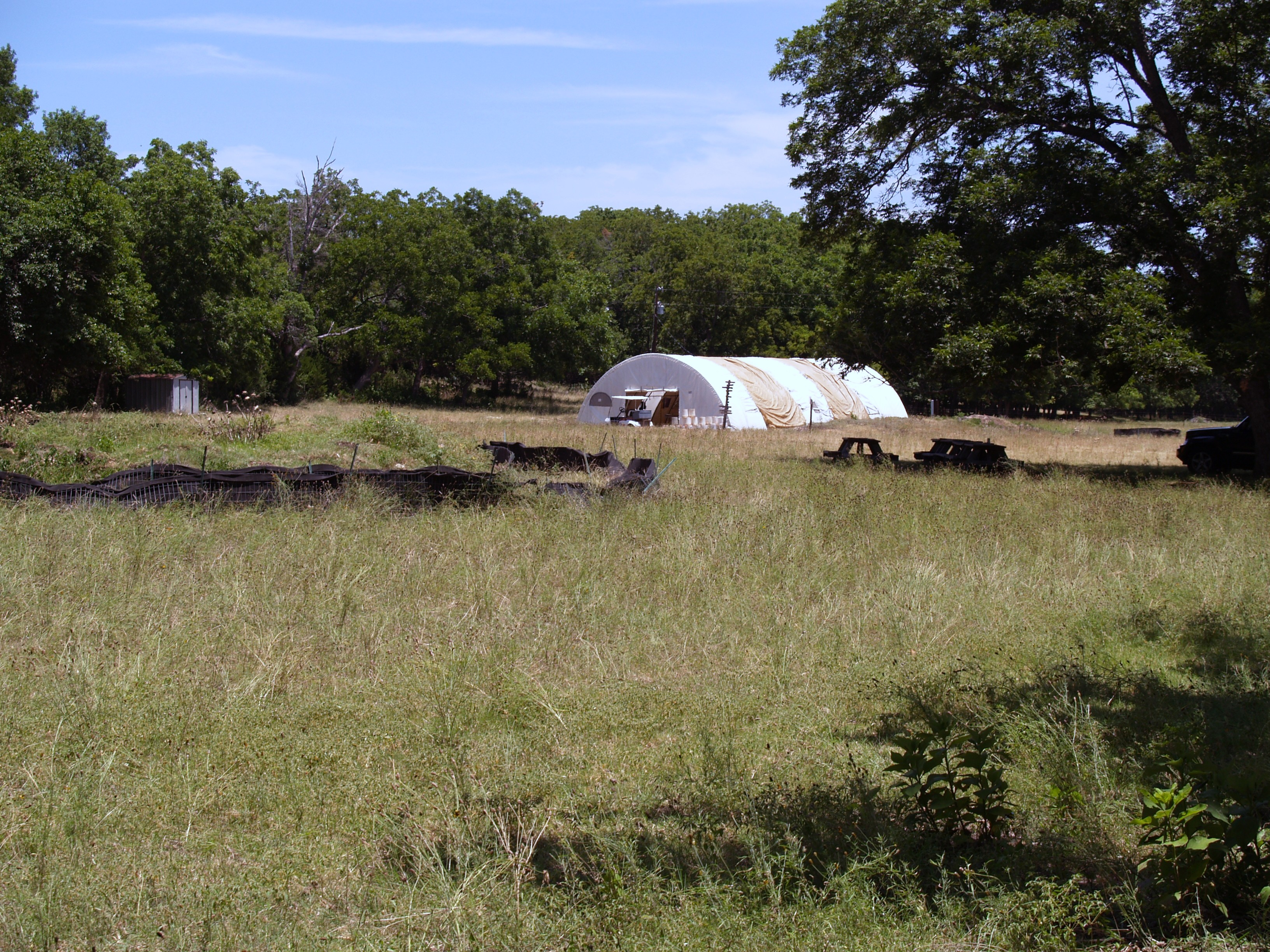
Part of the Gault site; the tent covers the 2007–2014 excavation

Probably the major issue troubling American archaeology over the last several decades has been establishing when the first humans arrived in the western hemisphere. For nearly half a century the large majority of working archaeologists adhered to the notion that people making and using the distinctive Clovis "point" and its associated lithic technology were the first to arrive about 13,500 calendar years ago and to have spread quickly throughout the Americas. However, there was always a small archaeological minority who contended that the first Americans (in the broadest, two-continent, sense) had been here long before Clovis times on both the east and west margins of both continents. In the last several decades, with the location, investigation, and reporting of a growing number of sites with reliable dating, more and more American archaeologists now believe the western hemisphere was occupied at least several thousand years prior to the appearance of diagnostic Clovis materials.

Most of these sites are widely spaced geographically and do not contain an extensive array of associated lithic materials that would show a diagnostic pattern of tool production and use. An attempt to define the characteristics of these older technologies can best be accomplished by investigating sites which are both well-stratified, containing both the older and Clovis materials—in order to compare technologies in use in the same location under similar conditions—and show evidence of extended periods of occupation where a wide range of activities took place employing the whole array of lithic tools.

The Gault site contains strata which date to prior to the appearance of Clovis (more than 13,500 years B.P.) and to Clovis (13,500 to 13,000 years B.P.), as well as the entire subsequent occupational sequence of the Central Texas region, from late Paleoindian (13,000 to 9,000 years ago) to Archaic (9,000 to 1200 years B.P.), and finally to Late Prehistoric (1200 to 500 years B.P.). A reason for this intensive and almost continuous occupation appears to be the site's location adjacent to two different but resource-rich ecosystems (the uplands of the Edwards Plateau and the lower Blackland Prairie) where water from Buttermilk Creek was available even in drought years, and where a wide variety of local food resources was concentrated. Another is that Gault was also a quarry site, where good quality Edwards chert toolstone (the Edwards Plateau is geologically one of the largest chert bearing formations in North America) was readily available, weathering out of the banks of both modern and ancient watercourses; chert from the Edwards Plateau has been identified as being used for toolmaking as far away as the Lindenmeier site in Colorado.

Additionally, the Clovis presence at the Gault site occurs in unprecedented abundance. A preliminary count of Clovis artifacts at the site numbers around 650,000 (including flakes, cores and formal tools), suggesting that a large number of people aggregated at the site and/or people resided at the site for an extended period of time. This evidence calls into question the traditional view of Clovis groups as highly mobile, dedicated big game hunters. Additionally, faunal material from the Gault site includes an array of large, medium-sized and small game such as mammoth, bison, horse, deer, rabbit, birds, and turtles, suggesting a generalized diet.

One of the most significant finds at the Gault site is that it is one of only twenty mammoth kill sites in the United States.

The national significance of the Gault site was recognized on May 29, 2018, by its official listing in the National Register of Historic Places. The site is also registered as a Texas State Antiquities Landmark.

== History ==
Henry Gault, from whom the site takes its name, put together a 250-acre farm in the Buttermilk Creek Valley, starting in 1904. At some point in the early 20th century he found extra income as an informant for early archaeological explorations in Central Texas working with the first professional archaeologist in Texas, J.E. Pearce, as well as avocational archaeologists (Alex Dienst, Kenneth Aynesworth and others).

The first excavations were carried out at the Gault site in 1929, by Professor J. E. Pearce of the University of Texas. He was attracted by the large size and prolific artifact content of the Archaic midden at Gault. Letters in the Pearce archives contain reference to extensive looting at the Gault site in 1929, and this continued (it was actually a "pay-to-dig" site for many years), including the use of a backhoe, until 1998, when new owners stopped the practice. Fortunately, the looters and collectors apparently rarely dug into the earlier deposits below the Archaic midden due to the lower density of collectible or marketable artifacts.

Limited test excavations were conducted in 1991, and sustained geoarchaeological investigations began in 1998, and continued through 2002, and from 2007 to 2015, under the auspices of Michael Collins and Thomas Hester of the Texas Archaeological Research Laboratory at the University of Texas at Austin, the Gault School of Archaeological Research (GSAR)Gault School of Archaeological Research :: Home and the Prehistory Research Project at Texas State University Prehistory Research Project : Department of Anthropology : Texas State University. In 2007, Michael Collins purchased the site and donated it to The Archaeological Conservancy Archaeological Conservancy Home. Currently a majority of the site is managed and administered by the GSAR on behalf of the Conservancy and tours and educational opportunities are available.

== Excavations ==
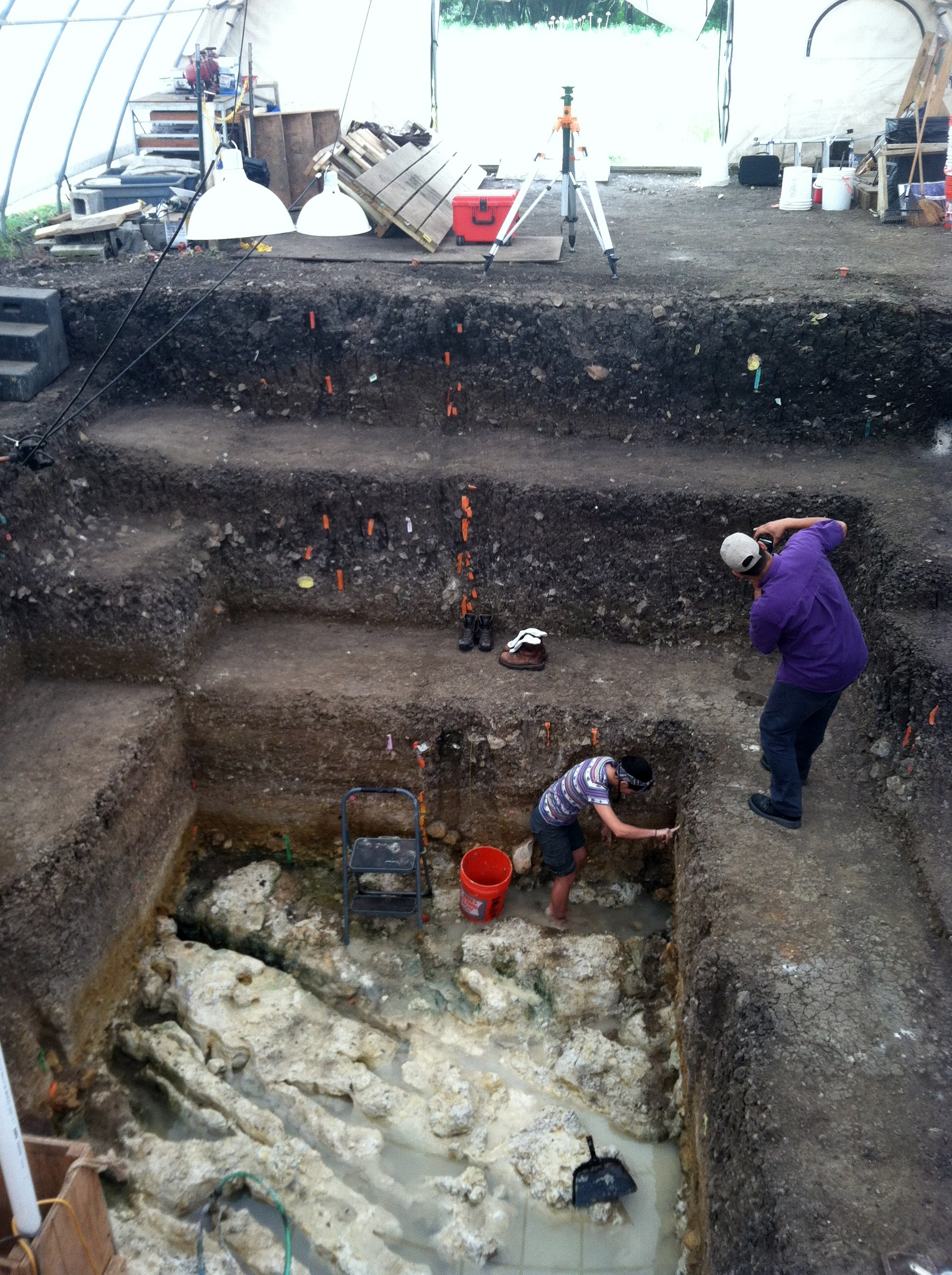
Gault site: the 2007–2014 excavation at bedrock

Excavations have been conducted in 15 areas, augmented by numerous machine-dug trenches and boreholes as well as the use of non-invasive geophysical procedures. The work in 1998–2002 focused on relatively undisturbed, early deposits beneath the looted midden. A sequence of cultural materials from early Paleoindian to early Archaic times was documented, including the technology styles identified as Clovis, Folsom, Wilson, St. Mary's Hall, Cody, Golondrina, Barber, Angostura, Hoxie, and Gower. Clovis was by far the most abundantly represented of these manifestations. Of the 11 cultures possible to find represented on archaeological sites in central Texas, the Gault site has samples of all 11.

Excavations in 2007–2014 in Area 15 of the Gault Site specifically targeted an occupation predating Clovis, evidence of which had been seen in two test units dug in 2002 and 2007. The excavation of a large block of Area 15 (48 m^{2} (520 ft^{2})) penetrated 3.5 m (11 ft) from the surface to bedrock through culture-bearing alluvial fill eventually exposing 12 m^{2} (130 ft^{2}) at bedrock. Unexpectedly, part of this area had escaped the looting and collecting and had intact archaeology just below the surface. Physical and cultural stratigraphic evidence as well as luminescence dating are consistent in showing a coherent sequence of lithic material evidencing this older occupation followed by Clovis, Late PaleoIndian, Early Archaic, and Middle/Late Archaic occupations over an apparent span of more than 16,000 calendar years. Skeptics note that some of the lithic artifacts recovered from older layers of the site resemble post-Clovis artifacts, indicating that the stratigraphy of the site is disturbed.

Tools numbering in the thousands were removed from the site before professional excavations began, however a large quantity of tools and debitage remained. Currently, the number recovered is estimated at ca. 2.6 million from 3% of the site. This includes artifacts from all the main cultural periods in Central Texas with the largest quantities belonging to the Clovis-age (more than 600,000 artifacts) and a significant number (150,000 - "The Gault Assemblage") of artifacts from the intact older strata. The findings from this part of the excavation are described more fully in "Evidence of an early projectile point technology in North America at the Gault Site, Texas, USA." A 2 by 3 m^{2} (22 by 32 ft^{2}) pavement of at least Clovis age with surrounding debris may represent early evidence of a structure or dwelling. More than 100 incised stones and one engraved bone have been recovered and the oldest, dating from the Clovis period, may represent the earliest portable art from a secure context in North America.

== Bibliography ==
=== General ===
- Mary S. Black, "Secrets of the Dirt: Uncovering the Ancient People of Gault", College Station: Texas A&M University Press, 2019
- Collins, M. B. (2002) "The Gault Site, Texas and Clovis Research". Athena Review 3(2):24–36.
- Waters, M.R., Pevny, C., and D. Carlson (2011) "Clovis Lithic Technology: Investigation of a stratified Workshop at the Gault Site, Texas". Texas A&M Press, College Station.

=== Geology ===
- Alexander, D. (2008) "Geoarchaeological investigation of natural formation processes to evaluate context of the Clovis component at the Gault site (41BL323), Bell County, Texas". Master's thesis, Texas A&M University. Texas A&M University.
- Gilmer, A. (2013) "Geoarchaeological Investigations of Site Formation Processes in Area 15 at the Gault Site, Bell County, Texas". Unpublished Master's thesis, Department of Anthropology, Texas State University, San Marcos, Texas.
- Hildebrand, J., S.M. Wiggins, J.L. Driver, and M.R. Waters (2007) "Rapid Seismic Reflection Imaging at the Clovis Period Gault Site in Central Texas". Archaeological Prospection 14(4): 245–260.
- Luchsinger, H. (2002) "Micromorphological Analysis of the Sediments and Soils from the Gault Site, a Clovis Site in Central Texas". Thesis, Department of Anthropology, Texas A&M University.
  - (2003) "Paleoclimate Under the Microscope: Sediment Micromorphological Analysis at the Gault Site, a Paleoamerican Site in Central Texas". Current Research in the Pleistocene 20: 126–128.
- Speer, C.A. (2014) "LA-ICP-MS Analysis of Clovis Period Projectile Points from the Gault Site. Journal of Archaeological Science 52: 1–11.
  - (2014) "Experimental sourcing of Edwards Plateau chert using LA-ICP-MS". Quaternary International, 342, pp. 199–213.
  - (2016) "A Comparison of Instrumental Techniques at Differentiating Outcrops of Edwards Plateau Chert at the Local Scale". Journal of Archaeological Science: Reports 7: 389–393.

=== Technology ===
- Anderson, J. (2013) "The Angostura Anomaly: A Comprehensive Analysis of This Unique Projectile Point Type". MA Thesis, Department of Anthropology, Texas State University.
- Beers, J.D. (2006) "A Usewear Analysis of Clovis Informal Stone Tools from the Gault Site, Texas". MA Thesis, Department of Anthropology, The University of Wyoming.
- Bradley, B.A., M.B. Collins, and C.A. Hemmings (2010) "Clovis Technology". International Monographs in Prehistory, Ann Arbor.
- Collins, M.B. (2007) "Discerning Clovis subsistence from stone artifacts and site distributions on the Southern Plains periphery". Foragers of the Terminal Pleistocene in North America, pp. 59–87. University of Nebraska Press, Lincoln.
- Collins, M. B., and C. A. Hemmings (2005) "Lesser-Known Clovis Diagnostic Artifacts I: The Bifaces". La Tierra 32(2): 9–20.
- Collins, M. B., and J. C. Lohse (2004) "The Nature of Clovis Blades and Blade Cores". In Entering America: Northeast Asia and Berengia Before the Last Glacial Maximum, edited by D. Madsen, pp. 159–183. University of Utah Press, Salt Lake City.
- Dickens, W.A. (2005) "Biface reduction and blade manufacture at the Gault Site (41BL323): a Clovis occupation in Bell County, Texas". Ph.D. dissertation, Department of Anthropology, Texas A&M University.
  - (2007) "Clovis Biface Lithic Technology at the Gault Site (41BL323), Bell County, Texas". Current Research in the Pleistocene 24: 78–80.
- Gandy, J. (2013) "Analysis of Lithic Debitage from the Older-Than-Clovis Stratigraphic Layers of the Gault Site, Texas". MA Thesis, Department of Anthropology, Texas State University.
- Lassen, R. (2013) "A Flute Runs Through It, Sometimes: Understanding Folsom Era Stone Tool Technology". Unpublished Ph.D. dissertation, Department of Anthropology, University of Tennessee.
  - (2015) "The Folsom-Midland Component of the Gault Site, Central Texas: Context, Technology, and Typology". Plains Anthropologist 60(234): 150–171.
  - (2016) "The Spectrum of Variation in Folsom-Era Projectile Point Technology." PaleoAmerica2(2): 150–158.
  - (2018) "A Comparative Study of Overshot Flaking Between Clovis and Other Components From the Gault Site, Texas". Lithic Technology 43(2):84-92.
- Lassen, R., and T. Williams (2015) "Variation in Flintknapping Skill Among Folsom-Era Projectile Point Types: A Quantitative Approach". Journal of Archaeological Science 4: 164–173.
- Lohse, J.C., Hemmings, C.A., Collins, M.B. and Yelacic, D.M. (2014) "Putting the specialization back in Clovis: what some caches reveal about skill and organization of production in the terminal Pleistocene". Clovis Caches: Recent Discoveries and New Research, p. 15. University of New Mexico Press, Albuquerque.
- Minchak, S.A. (2007) "Presence and Difference of Use Among 3A and 3B Clovis Blades at the Gault Site, Bell County, Texas". M.A. Thesis, Department of Anthropology, Texas A&M University.
- Pevny, C.D., and D.L. Carlson (2007) "Evidence for Shifts Between Clovis Biface and Blade Production at the Gault Site (41BL323), Texas". Current Research in the Pleistocene 24: 131–133.
  - (2010) "Clovis lithic debitage from excavation area 8 at the Gault Site (41BL323), Texas: form and function". Ph.D. dissertation, Department of Anthropology, Texas A&M University.
  - (2012) "Distinguishing taphonomic processes from stone tool use at the Gault site, Texas". Contemporary lithic analysis in the Southeast: problems, solutions, and interpretations, pp. 55–78. University of Alabama Press, Tuscaloosa.
- Smallwood, A.M. (2006) "Use-Wear Analysis of the Clovis Biface Collection from the Gault Site in Central Texas". M.A. Thesis, Texas A&M University.
  - (2015) "Building experimental use-wear analogues for Clovis biface functions". Archaeological and Anthropological Sciences, 7(1), pp. 13–26.
- Taylor-Montoya, John (2011) "Cultural Transmission and Artifact Evolution During the Paleoindian Period on the Southern Great Plains of North America". Unpublished Ph.D. dissertation, Anthropology, Southern Methodist University.
- Wiederhold, J. (2007) "Maximizing Tool Use: Endscrapers from the Gault Site". Current Research in the Pleistocene 24: 147–150.
- Williams, Thomas J. (2016) "The Morphology and Technology of Clovis Flat-Backed Cores from the Gault Site (41bl323), Texas". Lithic Technology 41(2):139-153.

=== Older-than-Clovis ===
- Collins, M.B., and B.A. Bradley (2008) "Evidence for Pre-Clovis Occupation at the Gault Site (41BL323), Central Texas". Current Research in the Pleistocene 25: 70–72.
- Collins, M.B., D.J. Stanford, D.L. Lowery, and B.A. Bradley (2013) "North America Before Clovis: Variance in Temporal/Spatial Cultural Patterns, 27,000 to 13,000 Cal Yr B.P." In Paleoamerican Odyssey, edited by K. Graf, C. V. Ketron and M. Waters, pp. 521–540. Center for the Study of the First Americans, College Station.

=== Incised stones ===
- Collins, M.B., T.R. Hester, and P.J. Headrick (1992) "Engraved Cobbles from the Gault Site". Current Research in the Pleistocene 9: 3–4.
  - Collins, M.B., T.R. Hester, D. Olmstead, and P.J. Headrick (1991) "Engraved Cobbles from Early Archeological Contexts in Central Texas". Current Research in the Pleistocene 8: 13–15.
- Hester, T.R., M.B. Collins, and P.J. Headrick (1992) "Notes on South Texas Archeology: 1992–1994, Paleo-Indian Engraved Stones from the Gault Site". La Tierra 19(4): 3–5.
- Lemke, A., D.C. Wernecke, and M.B. Collins (2015) "Early Art in North America: Clovis and Later Paleoindian Incised Artifacts from the Gault Site, Texas (41BL323)". American Antiquity 80(1): 113–133.
- Wernecke, D.C., and M.B. Collins (2011) "Patterns and Process: Some Thoughts on the Incised Stones from the Gault Site, Central Texas, United States". In L'Art Pleistocene dans le Monde, Actes Du Congres IFRAO 2010, edited by J. Clottes, pp. 120–121. Prehistoire, Art et Societies: Bulletin de la Societie Prehistorique Ariege-Pyrenees, LXV-LXVI, 2010–2011, Tarascon sur Ariege, France.

=== Fauna ===
- Lemke, A., and C. Timperley (2008) "Preliminary Analysis of Turtle Materials from the Gault Site, Texas". Current Research in the Pleistocene 25: 115–117.
- Timperley, C., and E. Lundelius, Jr. (2008) "Dental Enamel Hypoplasia in Late Pleistocene Equus from Texas and New Mexico". In Unlocking the Unknown: Papers Honoring Dr. Richard J. Zakrzewski, edited by G.H. Farley and J.R. Chaote, pp. 45–50. Fort Hays State University, Fort Hays Studies, Special Issue No. 2, Hays, KS.
- Timperley, C., P.R. Owen, and E. Lundelius Jr. (2003) "Preliminary Comments on Faunal Material from the Gault Site, Central Texas". Current Research in the Pleistocene 20: 117–119.

== Films ==
- The Stones are Speaking (dir. Olive Talley, 2024)

== See also ==
- Archaeology of the Americas
- Buttermilk Creek Complex
- Cactus Hill
- Cooper's Ferry site
- Meadowcroft Rockshelter
- Mockingbird Gap site
- Monte Verde
- Paisley Caves
- Settlement of the Americas
