= Swanee River =

Swanee River may refer to:

- Old Folks at Home, an 1851 song often known unofficially as "Swanee River", written by Stephen Foster
- Swanee River (1931 film), an American film
- Swanee River (1939 film), a film biography of Stephen Foster
- Swanee River (band)

== See also ==
- Suwannee River, the actual river in Florida which inspired the song
- Swanee (disambiguation)
