= Clovis culture =

Prehistoric culture in the Americas c. 11,100–10,800 BCE

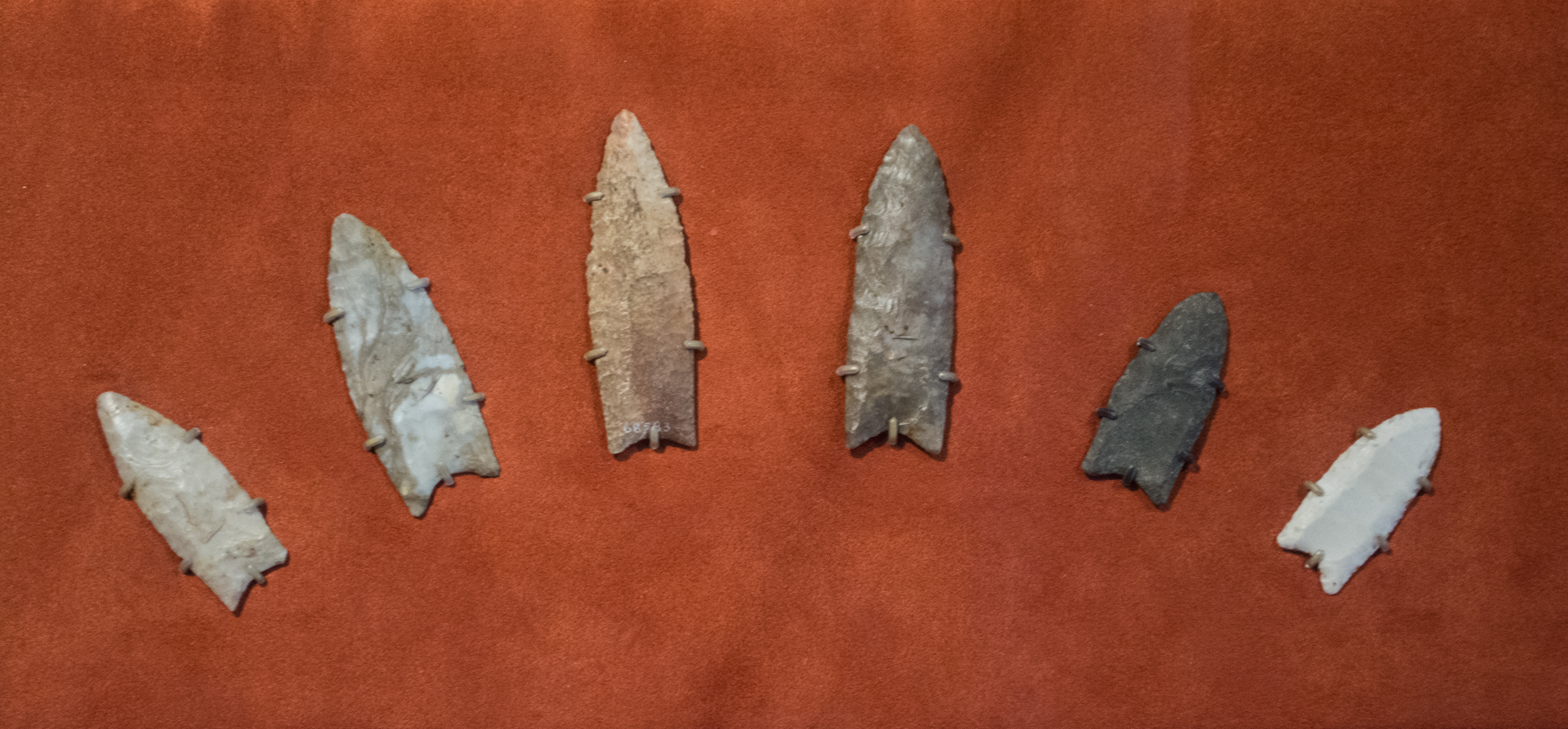
- Geographical range: North America
- Period: Paleoindian
- Dates: 13,050–12,750 BP (11,100–10,800 BC)
- Type site: Blackwater Draw, New Mexico
- Followed by: Folsom tradition (among others)

The Clovis culture is an archaeological culture from the Paleoindian period of North America, spanning around 13,050 to 12,750 years Before Present (BP). The type site is Blackwater Draw locality No. 1 near Clovis, New Mexico, where stone tools were found alongside the remains of Columbian mammoths in 1929. Clovis sites have been found across North America. The most distinctive part of the Clovis culture toolkit are Clovis points, which are projectile points with a fluted, lanceolate shape. (Note: Fluted: Having a flake removed from the base, either on one or both sides. Lanceolate: Tapering to a point at one end, like the head of a lance.) Clovis points are typically large, sometimes exceeding 10 centimetres (3.9 in) in length. These points were multifunctional, also serving as cutting tools. Other stone tools used by the Clovis culture include knives, scrapers, and bifacial tools, with bone tools including beveled rods and shaft wrenches, with possible ivory points also being identified. Hides, wood, and natural fibers may also have been utilized, though no direct evidence of this has been preserved. Clovis artifacts are often found grouped together in caches where they had been stored for later retrieval, and over 20 Clovis caches have been identified.

The Clovis peoples are thought to have been highly mobile groups of hunter-gatherers. It is generally agreed that these groups were reliant on hunting big game (megafauna). Clovis peoples had a particularly strong association with mammoths, and to a lesser extent with mastodon, gomphothere, bison, and horse; they also consumed smaller animals and plants. The Clovis hunters may have contributed to the Late Pleistocene megafauna extinctions in North America, though this idea has been subject to controversy. Only one human burial has been directly associated with tools from the Clovis culture: Anzick-1, a young boy found buried in Montana, who has a close genetic relation to some modern Amerindian populations, primarily in Central and South America.

The Clovis culture represents the earliest widely recognised archaeological culture in North America; however, in western North America, it appears to have been contemporaneous with the Western Stemmed Tradition. While historically, many scholars held to a "Clovis First" model, where Clovis represented the earliest inhabitants in the Americas, today this is generally rejected, with several generally accepted sites across the Americas being dated to at least a thousand years earlier than the oldest Clovis sites, including Monte Verde II, Cooper's Ferry, Paisley Caves, Page-Ladson, and Buttermilk Creek (Gault and Friedkin sites).

The end of the Clovis culture may have been driven by the decline of the megafauna that the Clovis hunted as well as decreasing mobility, resulting in local differentiation of lithic and cultural traditions across North America. Beginning around 12,750–12,600 years BP, the Clovis culture was succeeded by more regional cultures, including the Folsom tradition in central North America, the Cumberland point in mid/southern North America, the Suwannee and Simpson points in the southeast, and Gainey points in the Northeast–Great Lakes region. The Clovis and Folsom traditions may have overlapped, perhaps for around 80–400 years. The end of the Clovis culture is generally thought to be the result of normal cultural change over time.

In South America, the widespread similar Fishtail or Fell point style was contemporaneous to the usage of Clovis points in North America; they possibly developed from Clovis points.

== Discovery ==
On August 29, 1927, the first evidence of Pleistocene humans seen by multiple archaeologists in the Americas was discovered near Folsom, New Mexico. At this site, they found the first in situ Folsom point with the bones of the extinct bison species Bison antiquus. This confirmation of a human presence in the Americas during the Pleistocene inspired many people to start looking for evidence of early humans.

In 1929, 19-year-old Ridgely Whiteman, who had been closely following the excavations in nearby Folsom in the newspapers, discovered the Clovis site near the Blackwater Draw in eastern New Mexico. Despite several earlier Paleoindian discoveries, the best documented evidence of the Clovis complex was collected and excavated between 1932 and 1937 near Clovis, New Mexico, by a crew under the direction of Edgar Billings Howard until 1935 and later by John L. Cotter from the Academy of Natural Sciences at the University of Pennsylvania. Howard's crew left their excavation in Burnet Cave, the first professionally excavated Clovis site, in August 1932, and visited Whiteman and his Blackwater Draw site. By November, Howard was back at Blackwater Draw to investigate additional finds from a construction project.

The American Journal of Archaeology, in its January–March 1932 edition, mentions Howard's work in Burnet Cave, including the discovery of extinct fauna and a "Folsom type" point 4 feet below a Basketmaker burial. Reference is made to a slightly earlier article on Burnet Cave in The University Museum Bulletin from November 1931.

The Dent site in Colorado was the first known association of Clovis points with mammoth bones, as noted by Hannah Marie Wormington in her book Ancient Man in North America (4th ed. 1957). Gary Haynes, in his book The Early Settlement of North America, suggested the type of fluted point thereafter associated with megafauna (especially mammoths) at over a dozen other archaeological sites in North America would have been more appropriately named "Dent" rather than Clovis, the town near Blackwater Draw that gave the type of point its name.

== Material culture ==
A feature considered to be distinctive of the Clovis tradition is overshot flaking, which is defined as flakes that "during the manufacture of a biface are struck from prepared edges of a piece and travel from one edge across the face", with limited removal of the opposite edge. Whether or not the overshot flaking was intentional on the part of the stoneknapper has been contested, with other authors suggesting that overface flaking (where flakes that travel past the midline but terminate before reaching the opposite end are removed) was the primary goal. Other elements considered distinctive of the Clovis culture tool complex include "raw material selectivity; distinctive patterns of flake and blade platform preparation, thinning and flaking; characteristic biface size and morphology, including the presence of end-thinning; and the size, curvature and reduction strategies of blades". It has long been recognised that the definition of the Clovis culture is to a degree ambiguous, the term being "used in a number of ways, referring to an era, to a culture, and most specifically, to a distinctive projectile point type", with disagreement between scholars about distinguishing between Clovis and various other Paleoindian archaeological cultures.

=== Tools ===
==== Clovis point ====
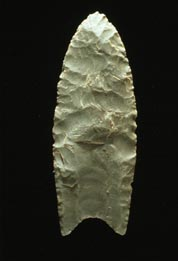
Example of a Clovis point

A hallmark of the toolkit associated with the Clovis culture is the distinctively shaped lithic point known as the Clovis point. Clovis points are bifacial (having flakes removed from both faces) and typically fluted (having an elongate flake removed from the base of the point) on both sides, with the fluting typically running up a third or a half of the length of the point, distinct from many later Paleoindian traditions where the flute runs up the entire point length. Clovis points are typically parallel-sided to slightly convex, with the base of the point being concave. The shape and size of Clovis points varies significantly over space and time; the largest points exceed 10 centimetres (3.9 in) in length. The points were generally produced from nodules or siliceous cryptocrystalline rocks. Clovis points were thinned using end-thinning ("the removal of blade-like flakes parallel to the long-axis"). They were initially prepared using percussion flaking, with the point being finished using pressure flaking.

Although no direct evidence of what was attached to Clovis points has been found, Clovis points are commonly thought to have served as tips for spears/darts likely used as handheld thrusting and/or throwing weapons (or possibly as ground-mounted pikes), possibly in combination with a spear thrower, for hunting and potentially also self-defense. Wear on Clovis points indicates that they were multifunctional objects that also served as cutting and slicing tools, with some authors suggesting that some Clovis-point types were primarily used as knives. Clovis points were at least sometimes resharpened, though the idea that they were continually resharpened "long-life" tools has been questioned. The points required considerable effort to make and often broke during knapping, particularly during fluting. The fluting may have served to make the finished points more durable during use by acting as a "shock absorber" to redistribute stress during impact, though others have suggested that it may have been purely stylistic or used to strengthen the hafting to the spear handle.

==== Blades ====
Clovis blades—long flakes removed from specially prepared conical or wedge-shaped cores—are part of the global Upper Paleolithic blade tradition. Clovis blades are twice as long as they are wide and were used and modified to create a variety of tools, including endscrapers (used to scrape hides), serrated tools, and gravers. Unlike bifaces, Clovis blade cores do not appear to have been regularly transported over long distances, with only the blades typically carried in the mobile toolkit.

==== Bifaces ====
Bifaces served a variety of roles for Clovis hunter-gatherers, such as cutting tools, preforms (partially shaped precursors) for formal tools such as points, and as portable sources of large flakes useful as preforms or tools.

==== Other tools ====
Other tools associated with the Clovis culture are adzes (likely used for woodworking), bone "shaft wrenches" (suggested to have been used to straighten wooden shafts), as well as rods, some of which have beveled (diagonally shaped) ends. These rods are made of bone, antlers, and ivory. The function of the rods is unknown and has been subject to numerous hypotheses. Rods that were beveled on both ends are most often interpreted as foreshafts to which stone points were hafted, with a pair of rods surrounding each side of the point (or alternatively, the point being surrounded by a single beveled rod and the end of the wooden shaft,) while rods that are beveled on only one end, with the other being pointed, are most often interpreted as projectile points. The rods may have served other purposes, such as prybars. Clovis people are also known to have used ivory and bone to create projectile points.

Beveled rod and Clovis spear reconstructions
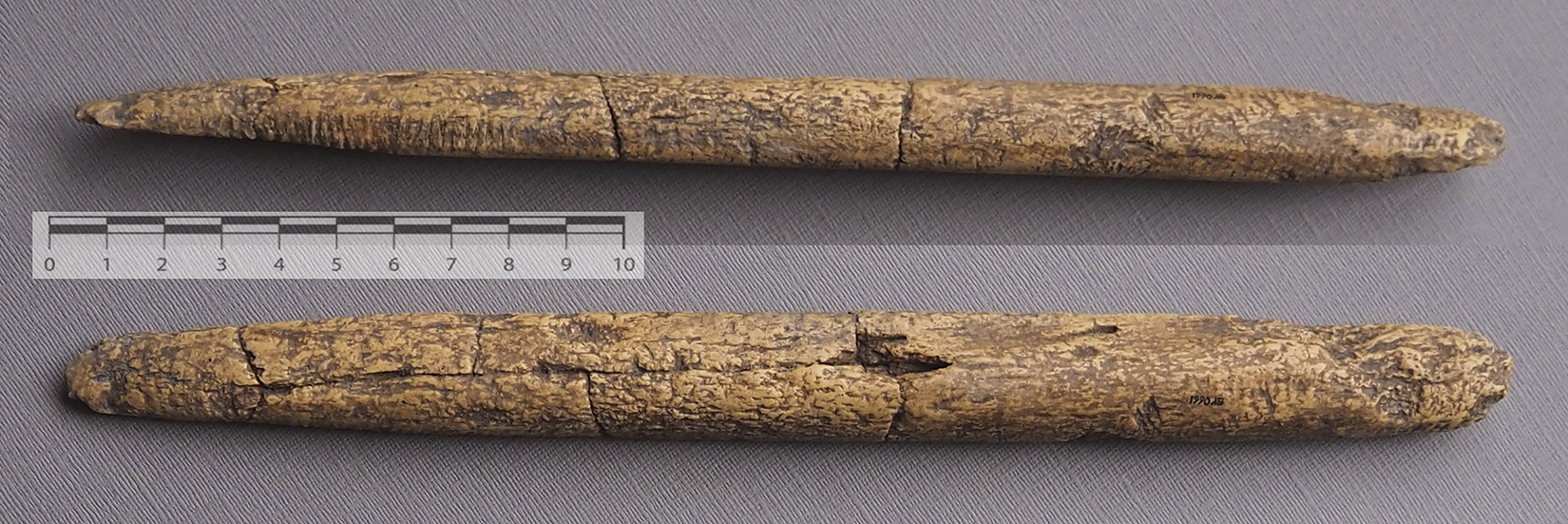
Replica of a Clovis beveled bone rod from the East Wenatchee site

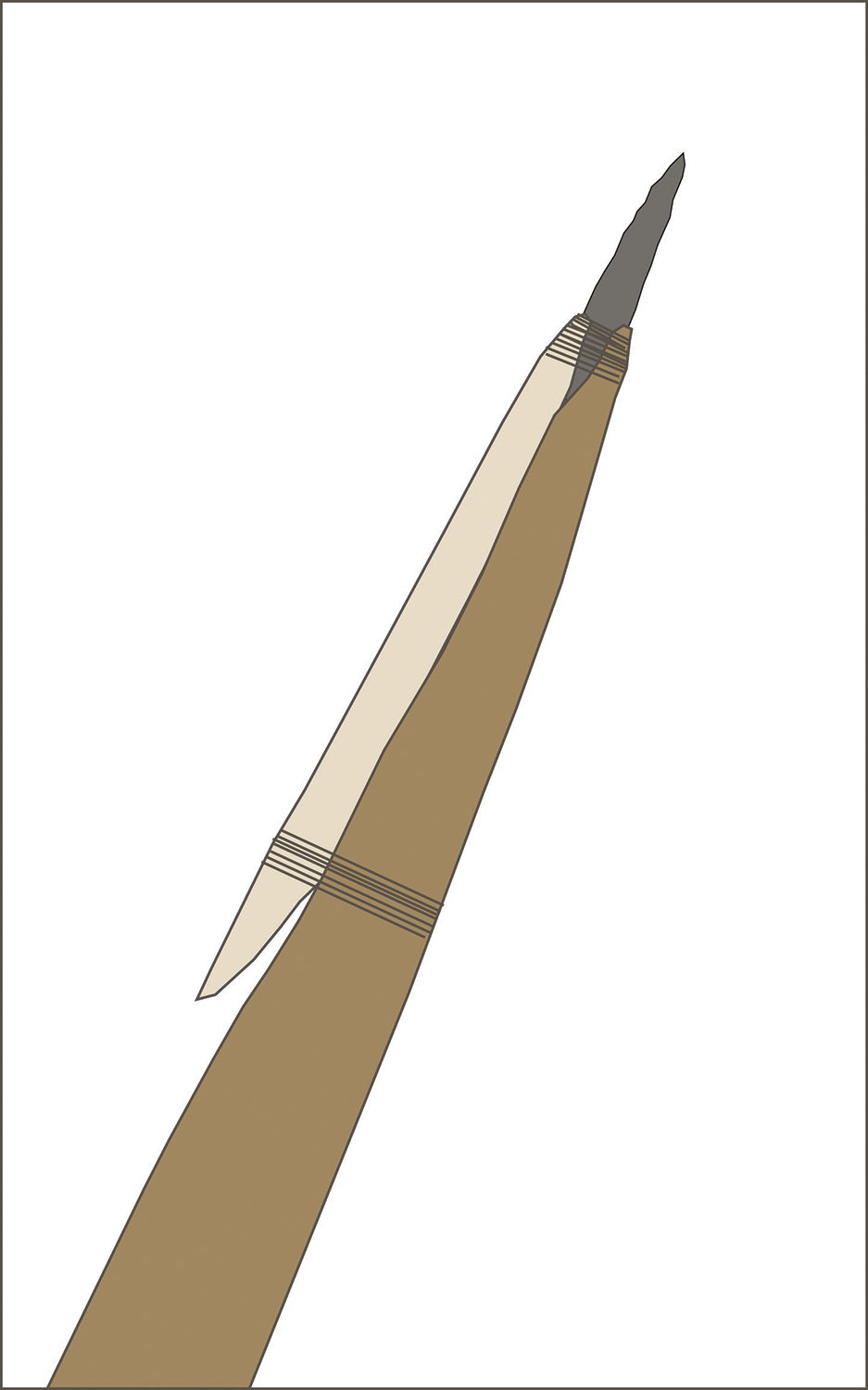
Diagram of a hypothetical reconstruction of a hafted Clovis weapon, including a Clovis point (gray), a beveled rod (cream), and a wooden shaft (brown)

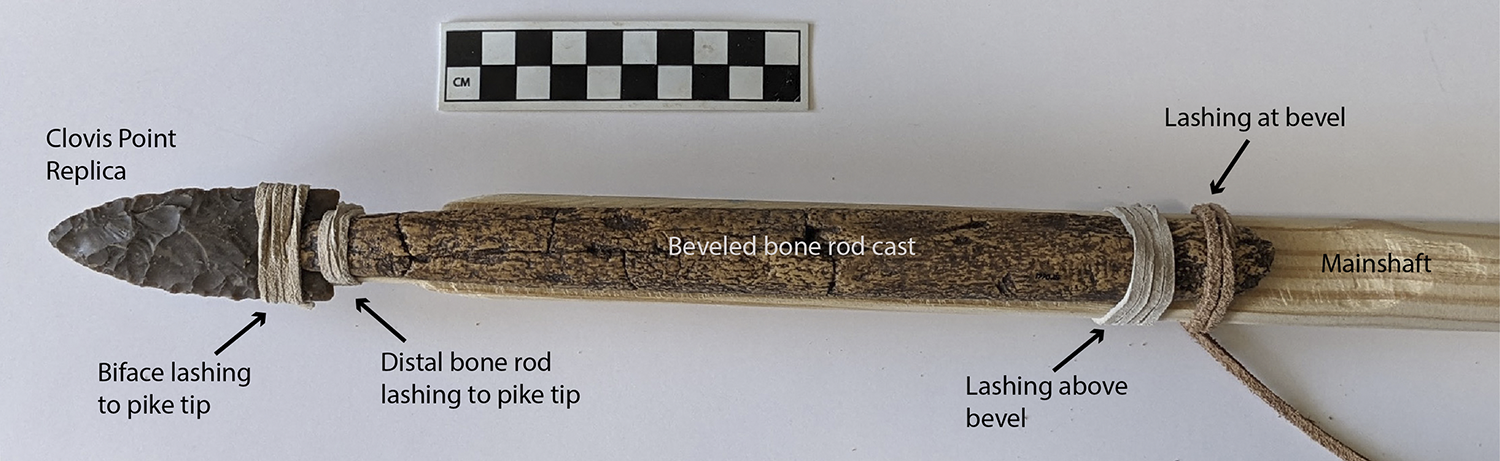
Hypothetical reconstruction of a hafted Clovis weapon, including a Clovis point, a beveled rod, a wooden shaft, and lashings

=== Caches ===
A distinctive feature of the Clovis culture generally not found in subsequent cultures is "caching", where a collection of artifacts (typically stone tools, such as Clovis points or bifaces) were deliberately left at a location, presumably with the intention to return to collect them later, though some authors have interpreted cache deposits as ritual behavior. Over twenty such "caches" have been identified across North America.

== Art and ritual practices ==
A few Clovis culture artifacts are suspected to reflect creative expression, such as rock art, the use of red ochre, and engraved stones. The best-known examples of this were found at the Gault site in Texas and consist of limestone nodules incised with expressive geometric patterns, some of which mimic leaf patterns. Clovis peoples, like other Paleoindian cultures, used red ochre for a variety of artistic and ritual purposes, including burials, and to cover objects in caches. Clovis peoples are known to have transported ochre 100 kilometres (62 mi) from its original outcrop. They are also suggested to have produced beads out of animal bones.

== Lifestyle ==
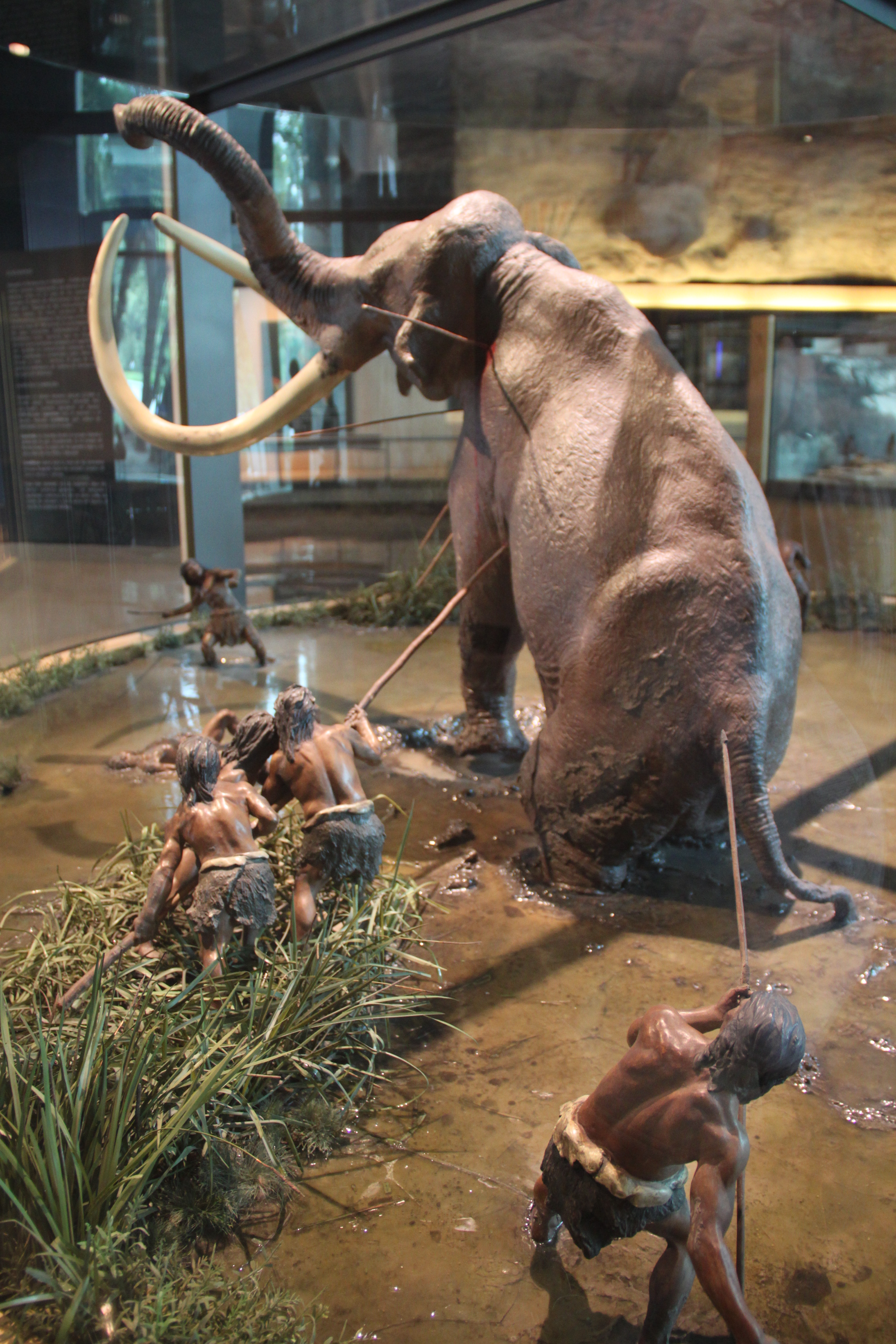
Diorama of Paleoindians hunting a Columbian mammoth in Mexico's National Museum of Anthropology

Clovis hunter-gatherers are characterized as "high-technology foragers" who utilized sophisticated technology to maintain access to resources while being highly mobile. In many Clovis localities, the stone tools found at a site were hundreds of kilometers away from the source stone outcrop, in one case over 900 kilometres (560 mi) away. The people who produced the Clovis culture probably had a low population density but with geographically extensive cultural networks. The Clovis culture is suggested to have heavily utilized hides, wood, and natural fibres, though no direct evidence of this has been preserved. Bone needles, likely used to stitch clothes from fur, have been found at the Clovis-associated La Prele site in Wyoming. They were made of jackrabbit, red fox, and feline (indeterminate to species, but suggested to likely be bobcat, Canada lynx, cougar, or American cheetah) bone, suggesting that these species were likely exploited for their pelts.

Clovis artifacts have often been found associated with big game, including proboscideans (Columbian mammoth, mastodon, and the gomphothere Cuvieronius), bison, and equines of the genus Equus. A handful of sites possibly suggest the hunting of caribou/reindeer, peccaries (Platygonus, Mylohyus), ground sloths (Paramylodon), glyptodonts (Glyptotherium), tapirs, the camel Camelops, and the llama Hemiauchenia. Proboscideans (predominantly mammoths) are the most common recorded species found in Clovis sites, followed by bison. However, the Clovis culture is not exclusively associated with large animals, with several sites showing the exploitation of small game like tortoises, with lagomorphs, predominantly jackrabbits, being found at around 31% of all sites. It is generally agreed that the people who produced the Clovis culture were reliant on big game for a significant portion of their diet, while also consuming smaller animals and plants, though some authors have argued for a generalist hunter-gatherer lifestyle that also involved the occasional targeting of megafauna.

Plant remains at Clovis sites (which are almost exclusively from eastern North America) primarily consist of food that can be easily gathered, such as fruit that required little processing, with little evidence of plant processing tools being found. The effectiveness of Clovis tools for hunting proboscideans has been contested by some authors, though others have asserted that Clovis points were likely capable of killing proboscideans, noting that replica Clovis points have been able to penetrate elephant hide in experimental tests, and that groups of hunter-gatherers in Africa have been observed killing elephants using spears. Isotope analysis of the only known Clovis burial, the young child Anzick-1 from Montana, suggests that mammoths made up a large proportion (~35–40%) of the total diet of this group, with major contributions also coming from elk and probably bison, with small animals only making up a small proportion (~4%) of the diet.

In the Southern Plains, Clovis people created campsites of considerable size, which are often on the periphery of the plains near sources of workable stone, from which they are suggested to have seasonally migrated into the plains to hunt megafauna. In the southeast, Clovis peoples created large camps that may have served as "staging areas", which may have been seasonally occupied, where a number of bands may have gathered for social occasions. At Jake Bluff in northern Oklahoma, Clovis points are associated with numerous butchered bones, representing a bison herd of at least 22 individuals of Bison antiquus,. At the time of deposition, the site was a steep-sided arroyo (dry watercourse) that formed a dead end, suggesting that hunters trapped the bison herd within the arroyo before killing them.

=== Megafaunal extinction ===
Beginning in the 1950s, Paul S. Martin proposed the "overkill hypothesis", suggesting that the Late Pleistocene megafauna extinctions in North America were driven by human hunting, including by Clovis peoples, with the hunting and extinction of large herbivores having a knock-on effect causing the extinction of large carnivores. This suggestion has been the subject of controversy. The timing of megafauna extinction in North America also coincides with major climatic changes, making it difficult to disentangle the effects of various factors. In a 2012 survey of archaeologists in The SAA Archaeological Record, 63% of respondents said that megafauna extinctions were likely the result of a "combination of factors".

== Genetics ==
The only known Clovis burial is that of Anzick-1, an infant boy who was found near Wilsall, Montana, in 1968. The body was associated with over 100 stone and bone artifacts, all of which were stained with red ocher. Radiocarbon dating of the skeleton along with the bone artifacts suggests it dates to approximately 12,990–12,840 years BP. Sequencing of his genome demonstrates that he is part of the same population as most modern Native Americans, and in particular is part of the "Southern Native American" (SNA) branch that is ancestral to modern Indigenous Americans in Central and South America, as opposed to the "Northern Native American" branch (which split from the SNA branch around 16,000 years ago) ancestral to most contemporary Indigenous Americans in North America north of Mexico.

There is considerable variability in the genetic affinity of Central and South American indigenous peoples to Anzick-1, with some of the oldest ancient South American individuals showing particularly close genetic ties. This indicates that ancestry related to Anzick-1 was already present among early populations of Central and South America by at least 11,000 years ago. However, this ancestry was not the primary source of the ancestry of later South American populations, indicating a major population turnover beginning at least 9,000 years ago. More recent genomic research indicates that the peopling of South America involved multiple dispersals and regional differentiation, characterized by periods of population replacement alongside long-term genetic continuity in some regions.

Like other Native Americans, Anzick-1 is closely related to Siberian peoples (having like other Native Americans as well as modern northeast Siberians a mixture of East Asian-related and Ancient North Eurasian ancestry, the latter associated with the Siberian Mal'ta–Buret' culture), confirming the Asian origin of the Clovis culture. He belongs to Y chromosome Haplogroup Q-L54, which is common among contemporary Native Americans, and to mitochondrial haplogroup D4h3a, which is rare among contemporary Native Americans (occurring in only 1.4%, primarily along the Pacific coast) but more common in the very earliest Indigenous Americans.

== Distribution and chronology ==
Some authors have suggested that the Clovis culture lasted for a relatively short period of a few centuries. A 2020 study suggests a temporal range, based on ten securely radiocarbon-dated Clovis sites, of 13,050 to 12,750 calibrated years BP, ending subsequent to the onset of the Younger Dryas; this is consistent with the results obtained in a 2007 study by the same authors. Other authors have argued that some sites extend the range of the Clovis culture back to 13,500 years BP, though the dating for these earlier sites is not secure. Some scholars have supported a long chronology for Clovis of around 1,500 years. Historically, many authors argued for a "Clovis first" paradigm, where Clovis, which represents the earliest recognisable archaeological culture in North America, were suggested to represent the earliest inhabitants of the Americas south of the Laurentide ice sheet (the ice sheet that, along with the smaller Cordilleran ice sheet to the west, covered most of Canada and parts of the northern contiguous United States, separating central North America from the ice-free East Beringia region comprising Alaska and parts of Yukon). However, since the beginning of the 21st century, this hypothesis has been abandoned by most researchers, as several widely accepted sites, notably Monte Verde II in Chile (c. 14,500 years BP), as well as Paisley Caves in Oregon (c. 14,200 years BP), Cooper's Ferry in Idaho (c. 15,800 years BP), Page-Ladson (c. 14,550 years BP) in Florida, and the Debra L. Friedkin and Gault sites (which are within 500 metres (1,600 ft) of each other) of the Buttermilk Creek Complex (c. ~15,500- to 13,500 years BP) in Texas, are suggested to be considerably older than the oldest Clovis sites. The White Sands footprints in New Mexico may be even older, dating to the Last Glacial Maximum, around 23,000 years ago.

Routes of the competing "Ice-free corridor" and "Coastal migration" hypotheses for human arrival into North America

Historically, it was suggested that the ancestors of the people who produced the Clovis culture migrated into North America along the "ice-free corridor" (the boundary region between the Laurentide and Cordilleran ice sheets that is suggested to have melted and become ice-free prior to the melting of the rest of the ice sheets, providing a passageway between Eastern Beringia and central North America), but many later scholars have suggested that a migration along the Pacific coast is more likely. A 2022 study proposed that the ice-free corridor was impassable until around 13,800 years ago, long after the earliest confirmed human presence in the Americas south of the ice sheets. It has also been suggested that the fluted projectile-point style of the Clovis culture originated in temperate North America south of the ice sheet and was later transported northwards along the expanding ice-free corridor.

The Clovis culture is known from localities across North America, from southern Canada to northern Mexico and across the east and west of the continent. The area of its origin remains unclear, though the development of fluted Clovis points appears to have occurred in North America south of the Laurentide Ice Sheet and not in Beringia. The Clovis culture may have originated from the Dyuktai lithic style widespread in Beringia. While some authors have suggested that the Clovis culture resulted from diffusion of traditions through an already pre-existing Paleoindian population, others have asserted that the culture likely originated from the expansion of a single population. In Western North America, the Clovis culture was contemporaneous with and perhaps preceded by the Western Stemmed Tradition, which produced unfluted projectile points, with the Western Stemmed Tradition continuing in the region for several thousand years after the end of Clovis.

The end of the Clovis culture may have been driven by the decline of the megafauna that the Clovis hunted, as well as decreasing mobility, resulting in local differentiation of lithic and cultural traditions across North America. This is generally considered to be the result of normal cultural change through time. There is no evidence that the disappearance of the Clovis culture was the result of the onset of the Younger Dryas, or that there was a population decline of Paleoindians following the end of the Clovis culture.

The Clovis culture was succeeded by various regional point styles, such as the Folsom tradition in central North America, the Cumberland point in mid/southern North America, the Suwannee and Simpson points in the southeast, and the Gainey points in the northeast-Great Lakes region. The Clovis and Folsom traditions may have overlapped, perhaps for around 80–400 years.

A number of authors have suggested that the Clovis culture is ancestral to other fluted point-producing cultures in Central and South America, like the widespread Fishtail or Fell point style.

== See also ==
- Early human migrations
- Peopling of the Americas
- Alternatives to the Clovis First theory
