= Domebo Canyon, Oklahoma =

Archaeological site in Oklahoma, U.S.

Domebo Canyon, Oklahoma is a Paleo-Indian archaeological site: the site of a mammoth kill in the prairie of southwestern Oklahoma. The Domebo archaeological site features deposits of both incomplete and partially articulated mammoth skeletal remains. Also found at the site were two complete and one fragmentary projectile point, along with three un-worked tool flakes made by prehistoric hunters who lived during the Pleistocene Epoch.

The site is historically significant because it marks one of the few archaeological sites in which mammoth skeletal remains were discovered in situ along with prehistoric stone tools. The site gives insight into the lives of prehistoric hunters and their impacts, helping the archaeological understanding of subsistence strategies during the Pleistocene Epoch.

== Etymology ==
Domebo is a Kiowa word for a musical instrument similar to a flute or flageolet.

== History ==
The Domebo site (also referred to as Domebo Canyon) is located in the west-central region of Oklahoma known as Caddo County. Caddo County has more than 451 archaeological sites. One hundred and fifteen of those sites date to the Plains Village era (A.D. 1000 to 1500). In contrast, the Domebo site dates to approximately 11,000 years ago.

== Discovery ==
The Museum of the Great Plains first learned of the Domebo site in December 1961. The site was discovered by Mr. J. E. "Buck" Patterson of Apache, Oklahoma. Patterson reportedly found bones protruding from the eroding bank of a deep, arroyo-like branch of the Tonkawa Creek. These bones included portions of a mammoth skull, tusk, and vertebrae. Adrian D. Anderson, then the curator of the museum, visited the site and discovered evidence of human occupation associated with the bones. He also determined that the site could be excavated. While diverting the river stream, in order to allow proper excavation and recovery, a medial fragment of a projectile point was discovered. The discovery of this human artifact in proximity to the mammoth remains warranted a more thorough and extensive excavation than originally anticipated. Initially the Domebo site was recognized to be a very promising site for paleontological and archaeological studies; the project also had potential for paleo-botanical and ecological studies.

The National Science Foundation funded the excavation. The Anadarko Area Office of the Bureau of Indian Affairs granted an excavation permit. After much anticipation, the excavation began February 1, 1962, two months after its initial discovery. While the excavation was taking place, the National Science Foundation awarded a second grant, which offset costs of the additional paleo-botanical and ecological studies.

== Findings ==
In addition to finding the incomplete and partially articulated skeletal remains from Mammuthus imperator, and several Clovis-style projectile points (discussed below), other notable discoveries are addressed in the stratigraphy or geological formation. Ecological evidence such as fresh water mollusks and faunal remains are also discussed in the three following sections.

=== Stratigraphy ===
The sequences of stratigraphy found in the Domebo Formation include what is referred to as both an upper and a lower member. The lower member, at the base of the Domebo Formation was not exposed during the excavation. The upper member, which rests on top of the lower member, consists of dark humic silt inter-bedded with yellowish-grey sand. It is fine-textured and intermittently interrupted by disconformities such as buried channels. It is believed that earlier than 11,000 years ago, alluvium or unconsolidated soil accumulated along a gully. In one area of uneven distribution, dark silt of the lower Domebo Formation also accumulated.

Stratigraphic evidence such as two colored clay deposits suggests that the bone bed was disturbed by erosion at least twice before its discovery. It is here that the bones of a mammoth along with projectile points were found buried beneath these deposits. While the bottom of the canyon where an imperial mammoth (Mammuthus imperator) was found is thought to be of a marshy consistency, it appears that the animal actually died on dry, solid ground. The remains were then covered by fine sands, followed by clay.

Radiocarbon dates of ca. 11,000 BP were recorded for the lower area of the Domebo Formation where the remains were discovered. This area where the mammoth was killed is thought to have once been a stream with abundant vegetation. Fossils of both freshwater and land mollusks further support this conclusion. The climate during this time would have supported these mollusks.

=== Archaeology ===
The Domebo site is classified as part of the Llano complex. The radiocarbon dates at the Domebo site shows consistency with dates from other mammoth kill sites in the southern Plains and the Southwest of the USA.

All mammoth bones excavated from the site were examined in the lab. After close examination, no signs of butchery, i.e. cut or hack marks, were present. However, examination of the position of large leg elements in situ, notably the occurrence of rib bones under the pelvis, indicated butchery or purposeful disarticulation.

The small size of the tusks suggests one of the animals was that of an immature female. A skull, two tusks, humeri, femora, ulnae, and right tibia, vertebral elements, both scapulae, and pelvic girdle were recovered in weathered condition.

Two projectile points and one point fragment were found associated with the mammoth remains. One, a medial fragment, was 41 millimetres (1.6 in) long and had a proximal width of 22.5 millimetres (0.89 in) and a distal width of 12 millimetres (0.47 in), with a maximum thickness of 7 millimetres (0.28 in). It is light blue-grey in color with inclusions of dark blue-black. The first projectile point found in situ is 78 millimetres (3.1 in) long; with a maximum width of 28 millimetres (1.1 in); a base width of 24 millimetres (0.94 in); and a maximum thickness of 7 mm. It is blue-grey to blue-black in color with a brownish hue. The second projectile point measures 68 millimetres (2.7 in) in length; with a maximum width of 21 millimetres (0.83 in) and a base width of 19 millimetres (0.75 in).

=== Ecology ===
Examination of matrix samples taken from the Domebo site showed that eight species of freshwater snails, twenty-one species of land snails, and two species of small freshwater clams sphaerids were present in the area at the time. Freshwater gastropods include the species Valvata tricarinata, Lymnaea caperata, Lymnaea dalli, and Gyraulus parvus (freshwater snails). Land gastropods include: Stenotrema leai aliciae, Vertigo ovata, and Vallonia gracilicosta (land snails). The mollusk evidence found in the matrix samples suggests that the area had marshy vegetation.

Pollen samples taken from the Domebo site were also examined. Samples include pine, spruce, oak, and elm pollens. This mixture suggests the area in and around the Domebo site had mixed boreal and deciduous elements. However, these pollens were likely displaced and carried by rainwater and air transport over some distance.

== Interpretation and significance ==
In Domebo Canyon, faunal remains of Mammuthus imperator were found with lithic artifacts of the Paleo Indian period that date to approximately 11,000 B.P. It is believed that the Paleo-Indian hunters may have used the stratigraphy of the Domebo branch to their advantage. The mammoth could have been driven into the soft alluvium of the Domebo Canyon where it may have become exhausted or stuck in the sediment, which would have allowed for an easier kill.

The Domebo site is significant as it shows that the Clovis point-mammoth bone association extends to the eastern margin of the southern Great Plains. The discovery shows that Clovis hunters may have shared a cultural unity throughout the Great Plains region.

== Discrepancies ==
During the Domebo excavations, it was rumored that additional projectile points discovered near the Domebo site had been intentionally planted, in order to suggest a correlation with the mammoth remains. Archaeologist Frank C. Leonhardy confirmed that a visitor who was not associated with the Domebo project, did in fact plant unassociated projectile points in close proximity to the Domebo discovery, in an attempt to be credited with the discovery. After investigation, the person confessed. As of 2012 however, no other discrepancies have been discovered that would relate to the integrity or authenticity of the skeletal or projectile evidence found at the Domebo archaeological site.

Two of the three projectile points (two complete and one fragmentary) unearthed at the Domebo Canyon site are classified as Clovis. The second of the two complete projectile points is somewhat uncharacteristic of typical Clovis points, and is thought to resemble a Plainview type.

A fourth projectile point and two flakes that were found downstream from the initial three projectile points and mammoth remains may be associated with the Domebo find. These artifacts may have been displaced by erosion, which would account for their shift in location downstream from the initial Domebo mammoth site.

== See also ==
- Clovis culture
- Paleo-Indians
- Mammoth
- Projectile point
- Pleistocene
- Pre-Clovis
