= USS Suwanee =

USS Suwanee or Suwannee may refer to one of these United States Navy ships:

- USS Suwanee (1864), a double-ended side-wheel gunboat commissioned in February 1865, sent in pursuit of Confederate States Navy commerce raiders until the end of the American Civil War, and wrecked in 1868
- USS Suwanee (1897), the United States Lighthouse Service lighthouse tender USLHT Mayflower, which served the U.S. Navy from April to December 1898 as the auxiliary cruiser USS Suwannee
- USS Suwanee (ID-1320), a cargo ship in commission in 1919
- USS Suwannee (CVE-27), a fleet oiler acquired in 1941, converted to an escort aircraft carrier in 1942 and in service until 1946
