= Dent site =

Clovis culture archeological site in Colorado, US

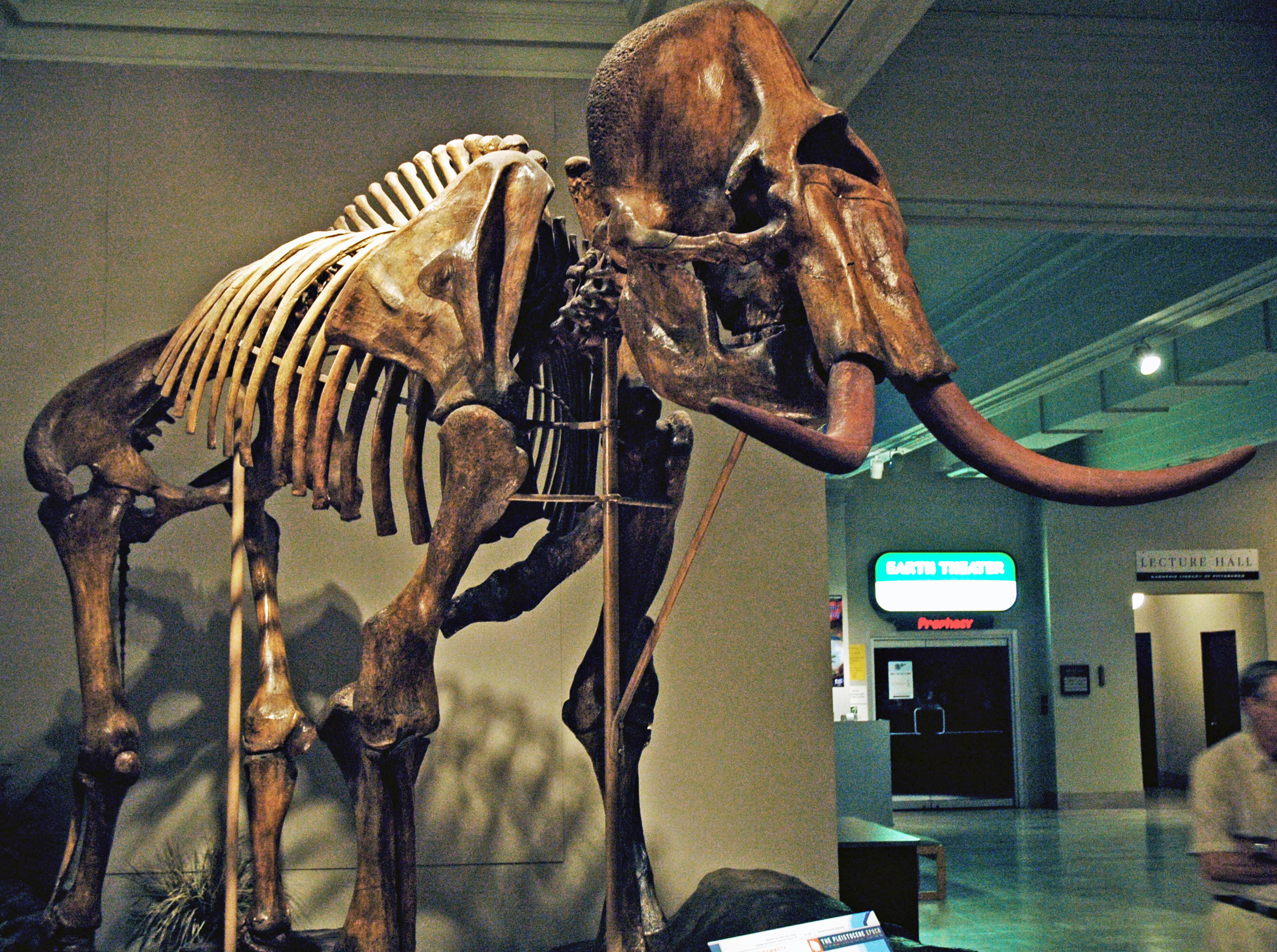
Columbian mammoth skeleton found with Clovis points at the Dent site

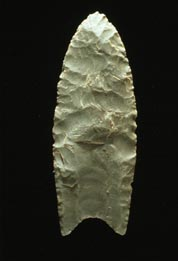
A Clovis projectile point created using bifacial percussion flaking (that is, each face is flaked on both edges alternatively with a percussor). Image courtesy of the Virginia Dept. of Historic Resources.

The Dent site is a Clovis culture (about 11,000 years before present) site located in Weld County, Colorado, near Milliken, Colorado. It provided evidence that humans and mammoths co-existed in the Americas. The site is located on an alluvial fan alongside the South Platte River.

== Discovery ==
The Dent railroad depot was once located next to the South Platte River southeast of Milliken, Colorado. Railroad tracks serving the depot ran over eroded Ice-Age terrace remnants south and west of the river’s modern floodplain. After heavy spring rains in April, 1932, railroad foreman Frank Garner noticed very large animal bones eroding from a deep gully draining through a low sandstone bluff west of the tracks. Word of the discovery reached Regis College professor of geology, Jesuit priest Conrad Bilgery, through one of his students, son of the Dent Depot manager. In September, 1932, Father Bilgery excavated some of the bones with his students, identifying them as mammoth. He then contacted Colorado Museum of Natural History (now Denver Museum of Nature & Science) paleontology curator Jesse Figgins about the find. Figgins delegated further exploration of the mammoth remains to museum staff member, Frederick Howarter, who conducted excavations in June and July, 1933, with museum volunteers, trustees, Father Bilgery, and his Regis College students.

The Dent site, in Weld County, Colorado, was a mammoth fossil excavation for most of 1932. The first Dent Clovis point was found November 5, 1932 and the in situ point was found July 7, 1933.

== Findings ==
=== Clovis culture ===
The Clovis culture (about 13,300 - 12,900 calendar years before present) used projectile points in hunting. Previous to the use of projectile points, indigenous people used a tool-kit like that used in Asia, which included large axe cutting tools, scrapers, blades and flake tools. The Clovis point was the first use of large, symmetrical and fluted projectile points. (Note: Clovis culture was considered the first culture to use projectile points to hunt on the North American continent. Since then, a pre-Clovis site was found in Manis, Washington, that found use of projectile points to hunt mastodons.)

=== Mammoth bones ===
Mammoth bones and what were later called Clovis points (Note: John Colter identified the Dent site projectile points as Clovis points when he worked on the Blackwater Draw site near Clovis, New Mexico in 1936-1937.) were found at the Dent site in 1932. The site was notable for both the presence of the projectile points larger than the known Folsom points and one of the first direct pieces of evidence that man and mammoth co-existed in the Americas. (Note: The Burnet Cave article identifies itself as the first place that Clovis points were located.) The mammoth killed were not part of a family group, as originally hypothesized, and were not related to other mammoth killed at Clovis sites such as Blackwater, New Mexico and Miami, Texas.

== Excavations ==
Year	Name	Organization	Period and artifacts	Comments
1932	Father Conrad Bilgery	Regis University	Columbian mammoth (Mammuthus columbi) bones and projectile points later identified as Clovis points.	Father Conrad Bilgery at Regis College was notified following the discovery who conducted an initial excavation of the site.
1933	Jesse Dade (J.D.) Figgins	Denver Museum of Natural History	At least 12 mammoth, mostly young or female. Figgins believed rocks 12 inches (30 cm) were brought in to assist the kill.	Figgins was considered the "Early Man expert" due to his work at the Folsom site in New Mexico.
1973	Joe Ben Wheat, Marie Wormington, Frank Frazier, Vance Haynes	University of Colorado	Total of 15 mammoth.	Radiocarbon dating of 11,200 +/- 500 years before present.
1987	Robert Brunswig, Jr.	University of Northern Colorado	Total of 15 mammoth, 10 young and 5 adults (22-43), with evidence of butchering.	Radiocarbon dating was performed again, with dates 10,590 +/- 500 years before present and 10,950 +/- 480 years before present, at the low end of the estimated range from 1973. The killings were estimated to have been committed during the fall. Plants of the late Pleistocene period were found in mammoth teeth tarter: grass, prickly pear, bark and riverine plants.

== See also ==
- Game drive system
- Manis Mastodon site – dated to around 14,000 years old
