= Burnet Cave =

Archaeological and paleontological site in New Mexico

- Rocky Arroyo Cave of Wetmore
- Interactive map of Burnet Cave
- Location: Eddy County
- Coordinates: 32°22′00″N 104°47′00″W
- Height variation: 21 m

Burnet Cave (also known as Rocky Arroyo Cave of Wetmore) is an important archaeological and paleontological site located in Eddy County, New Mexico, United States within the Guadalupe Mountains about 26 miles west of Carlsbad.

== Physical details ==
The cave has a southern exposure and is reported as being 21 m (70 feet) from the canyon floor. It has an elevation of 1402 m (4600 feet) according to Shultz and Howard (1935).

== Archaeological finds ==
The cave originally had two walls. They were removed by locals several years before professional excavation began. The locals also dug several 3 foot deep holes and removed several baskets (one containing charred bones), fragments of netting, hide, sandals, and beads.

Excavation began in Burnet Cave under returning student E. B. Howard who was working under Alden Mason's Southwestern Expeditions sponsored by the University of Pennsylvania Museum of Anthropology and Archaeology. The first southwestern trip was in 1929 and Bill Burnet showed them this cave on one of the first trips west. The early field seasons at Burnet Cave were 1930, 1931, and 1932, and they went back again in 1936 and 1937 (Howard 1936:22, 1943b). Additional survey work in the Guadalupe Mountains was done in 1934 as well but no new early sites were found (Howard 1935). Three cremated burials were found, with material, including a sper point, dating it to the Basket Maker (Ancestral Puebloans) culture.

The first Clovis point (termed Folsom-like by the excavator) found in the modern era was excavated in situ at Burnet Cave five feet, seven inches below ground surface (well below the burial level) on the edge of a hearth with burnt bison and musk-ox bones in August 1931(UPenn Museum catalog # 31-47-36) (Boldurian and Cotter 1999:73). This find may predate the Dent Site, Clovis, and all others proposed as being the first in situ Clovis find in the Americas. Howard brought this projectile point to the 1931 Pecos Conference and showed it to several people, including Frank H H Roberts (discussed in Woodbury's Pecos history- 1983).

Until about 1950 Burnet Cave was considered to be among the handful of truly reliable intact Clovis sites but around that time it seems to have fallen out of favor because it was a cave, with an unusual Clovis faunule, that lacked the dramatic visions of the Mammoth-killing big game hunters myth then coming into vogue.

Burnet Cave was the first multi-component Paleoindian site excavated, though no additional. The Clovis layer was four feet below the lowest layer containing Basketmaker material. The fine dirt was run through a ¼" screen at the front of the cave, something quite unusual for archaeological fieldwork at this time (Boldurian and Cotter 1999:7). The poet Loren Eiseley was a member of Howard's crew and wrote scathingly about his experiences in the Guadalupe Mountains.

== Paleontology finds ==
- Aves: Aechmophorus occidentalis, Cathartes (C. aura Brodkorb), Coragyps (C. atratus, C. occidentalis), Gymnogyps (G. californianus amplus), Accipiter (A. cooperi), Buteo swainsoni, Falco mexicanus Falco sparverius, Tympanuchus pallidicinctus, Oreortyx pictus, Meleagris gallopavo, Grus canadensis, Bubo virginianus, Asio flammeus, Colaptes auratus, Xanthocephalus xanthocephalus, Loxia curvirostra.
- Aves (Extinct): Meleagris (M. crassipes)
- Mammals: Antilocapra americana, Bassariscus astutus, Canis latrans, Canis lupus, Conepatus mesoleucus, Cynomys ludovicianus, Dipodomys (D. ordi), Felis concolor, Lemmiscus curtatus, Lepus(L. townsendii and L. alleni), Lynx rufus, Marmota flaviventris, Microtus (M. lonqicaudus, M. mexicanus, M. pennsylvanicus), Mustela nigripes, Navajoceros fricki, Neotoma cinerea (N. lepida or N. stephensi, N. mexicana), Odocoileus hemionus (O. virginianus), Ovis canadensis, Cratogeomys (C. castanops), Peromyscus maniculatus, Sorex, Spermophilus variegatus, Sylvilagus audubonii, (S. nuttallii), Taxidea taxus, Thomomys bottae (T. umbrinus), Vulpes velox (V. vulpes).
- Mammals (Extinct): Arctodus sp., Bison antiquus, Camelops, Equus tau, E. francisci, Mexican Horse (E. conversidens), E. alaskae, Euceratherium collinum, Stockoceros onusrosagris
- Reptilia: Phrynosoma douglasii (Rickart), Phrynosoma cornutum (Rickart), Crotaphytus collaris (Rickart), Sceloporus (Rickart).

== See also ==
- Cooper's Ferry site
