= Cumberland point =

Lithic projectile point found in North America

A Cumberland point is a lithic projectile point, attached to a spear and used as a hunting tool. These sturdy points were intended for use as thrusting weapons and employed by various mid-Paleo-Indians (c. 11,000 BP) in the Southeastern United States in the killing of large game mammals.

Cumberland points are primarily found in the Cumberland River basin and throughout the Tennessee River basin. With less frequency they are found in the Mississippi River basin and in the Ohio River basin. These points have been found in the Great Lakes region with rare frequency and have been reported in Minnesota by the University of Minnesota.

== See also ==
- Other projectile points
