= Simpson point =

Type of prehistoric projectile point found in the Americas

The Simpson point is a Paleo-Indian projectile point with a wide blade noted for exhibiting a narrowed 'waist' (middle section). It also features a concave base and eared basal corners. It was named in 1962 by Ripley P. Bullen. Points are mostly dated to 9000BC and are considered to be a typical example of the Middle Paleo-Indian subperiod (9000-8500 BC).
