= Suwannee point =

Type of prehistoric projectile point found in the Americas

The Suwannee point is a large unfluted lanceolate type of Paleo-Indian projectile point that features a recurvate profile with a slightly narrowed waist and a convex base.

The point is one of the earliest forms of lanceolate types and is dated between 10500–9500 Before Present. It represents a typical example of the Middle Paleoindian subperiod. Experts are divided over whether the type predates or postdates the Clovis point but have noted that the two share similarities in their construction. Suwanee specimens are generally unfluted, which distinguishes them from the generally fluted Clovis. However, a few rare examples of fluted Suwanee have also been discovered.

The largest concentration of Suwanee points appear in Florida, where the classification was first named in 1968 by Ripley P. Bullen for Suwannee County.
