= Prehistory of West Virginia =

The Prehistory of West Virginia spans ancient times until the arrival of Europeans in the early 17th century. Hunters ventured into West Virginia's mountain valleys and made temporary camp villages since the Archaic period in the Americas. Many ancient human-made earthen mounds from various mound builder cultures survive, especially in the areas of Moundsville, South Charleston, and Romney. The artifacts uncovered in these areas give evidence of a village society with a tribal trade system culture that included limited cold worked copper. As of 2009, over 12,500 archaeological sites have been documented in West Virginia.

== Origins ==
The first evidence of humans in West Virginia dates back to the nomadic Paleo-Indians in 11,000 BCE. From 7000 to 1000 BCE, archaic Native American cultures developed in the Northern Panhandle, the Eastern Panhandle, and the Kanawha River Valley. They created temporary villages on the Kanawha region streams, Monongahela and Potomac tributary streams of the Allegheny Mountains. The early archaic people used tools, such as the atlatl.

Cultural anthropologists use the spread of cultural items to examine inter-cultural middleman trade, migration, direct trade and intermarriage, enslavement after warfare, and mutual absorption of cultural elements between the prehistoric peoples.

=== Geography ===
Appalachian zones in the US

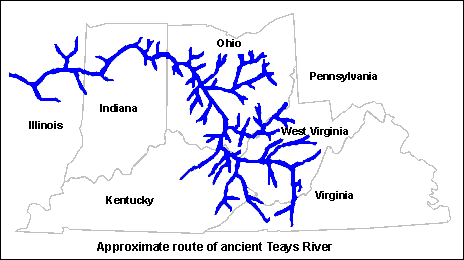
Teays River network (blue lines: rivers) as it existed prior to disruption by glaciers, the Quaternary Ice Age. Among the broader ranging Burbot, the Bowfin and the Gar descended from Jurassic fishes of the Teays River.

West Virginia is within the physiographic province of the unglaciated Allegheny Plateau, which includes parts of the Allegheny Front and Ridge-and-Valley Appalachians. These western hills along the Ohio Valley climb east up tributary streams to the base of the Allegheny Mountains. The lowest altitude averages 550 to 600 feet (170 to 180 m) above the sea level, with the lowest point to the southwest along the Ohio River at 538 feet (164 m) above sea level. Below the eastern slopes of the Allegheny Front where approximately 2,600 to 4,700 feet (790 to 1,430 m) peaks stand, the Potomac River on the Eastern Panhandle of West Virginia flows along a 2,000 feet (610 m) plateau. The plateau reaches from southeastern Ohio through western West Virginia to the Ridge-and-Valley Appalachians, and is bisected with a summit level ranging from about 1,200 to 1,800 feet (370 to 550 m).

The Allegheny Mountains have no volcanic peaks and have very little earthquake activity. These mountains were formed by an Orogeny effect of the North American Plate. The Taconic Orogeny near the end of Ordovician time formed a much higher mountainous area in eastern West Virginia approximately 350 million to 300 million years ago during the Carboniferous period. The West Virginia Geological and Economic Survey conducted in 2006 reported, "These highlands formed the main source of sediments for the succeeding Silurian Period (443 million years ago) and part of the Devonian Period (416 million years ago)." Devonian was about the time lobe-finned fish developed legs (Tiktaalik) as they started to walk on land as tetrapods. The Mesozoic Era (251.9 to 66 million years ago), the Age of Dinosaurs, is marked by Cretaceous–Paleogene extinction event and following Cenozoic Era with the dominant terrestrial vertebrates mammals from 66 million years ago to the present: the Age of Mammals. Some of these ancient animal evidence are found as fossils between the geologic strata near the abundant sections of coal seams and nearby natural gas (fossil fuel ranges) in the state.

The Quaternary ice age (2.6 million BCE) began during the Pleistocene Epoch. Sitting snugly in the then much higher mountains was Glacial Teays Lake, extending from south Virginia through the New Kanawha River to its northerly drainage river, the ancient Teays River. It flowed through Ohio to central Indiana, then across Illinois to the Mississippi Valley. The Pittsburgh drainage basin is to the north of the river. The Mississippi River at the time was an embayment of the Gulf of Mexico reaching to Illinois. Glacial Teays Lake last occurrence was about two million years ago when it outburst and the wash build up created the final large prehistoric lake in the western part of the state. Lake Tight lasted 6500 years before it escaped its confines to form the Ohio Valley. The Ohio-Allegheny system (Ohio Valley) in western half of the state had its present form by the Middle Pleistocene, between 781 and 126 thousand years ago. The glacial Monongahela Lake was in the northern part of the state. It was blocked by ice terraces in the northwestern Pennsylvania. Upon the ice's retreat, it outburst through the basin to the north.

The last maximum extent of glaciation, known as the Last Glacial Maximum, was approximately 18,000 years ago. This last returning advancement of glacial ice approaching the Ohio Valley began 30,000 years ago. West Virginia had no ice sheet buildup during this time. During the Last Ice Age smaller glaciation impounded lakes continued to collect precipitation on the plateau. These chilly lakes among mountain peaks were separated from the continental ice sheet to the north. The deeply carved river valleys, such as the upper Canaan Valley to Blackwater Canyon and the Dolly Sods Wilderness to Cheat River areas, are called Paleozoic Plateaus. The "Driftless Area" drains into rivers having rugged regions of bluffs and valleys. According to the West Virginia Geological and Economic Survey, the two large Ice Age lakes varied throughout the epoch. The last glacial lake, Monongahela, has been dated by Carbon-14 testing to between 22,000 and 39,000 years old. It reached as far south as Weston, West Virginia. The first ice-damming event was a pre-Illinoian (Stage) lake, which outburst during the earlier ice retreat towards the northwest Pittsburgh drainage basin. The last occurrence of the Monongahela Lake outburst was an outwash gravel dam backed up slackwater at Allegheny-Monongahela confluence during an Illinoian ponding event during the last glacial retreat. The last outburst drained the water to its present course in the central Allegheny Mountains or northern tributaries of the state feeding the Monongahela and Ohio Rivers.

The Cirque and Tarn (lake) were two of the heads of smaller outwashes through the Allegheny Plateau. Some of these backed waters cut through, leaving higher flatland or terraces among ridge tops above the major river bottoms from which runoff sheds. Higher in the state is Cranberry Glades which lay between Mountain ridge top and peaks with five small, boreal bogs. These feed the Cranberry River. The Allegheny Plateau has eroded and settled from these mountain and hill formations. In Pennsylvania, the Titusville Till was formed by very ancient Monongahela Lake sediment and is around 40,000 years old. There are several different strata of till layers across the region. Outflow of melt and weather contributed to the hill and mountain erosion. On top of the layers of geologic strata, settled drifts of kame (or gravel shoals) lay under soil sediments along the valley bottoms. "As one proceeds westward, the rocks are younger and younger," states Peter Lessing, July 1996, West Virginia Geological and Economic Survey. Below outcrops of the Paleozoic Plateaus are the largest kind of sediment by erosion, the large boulders peeking above the rivers surface. A variety of stones for lithic tool making are found across the state in valleys (Brockman, US Forest Service, 2003). From this stone, artifacts are found, providing evidence that Paleo-Indians passed through West Virginia. State universities and the U.S. Geological Survey paleoanthropologists have found evidence of early Archaic people habitating the region during the Holocene Climate Optimum — a rough interval of 9,000 to 5,000 years B.P.

=== Ecosystems and migration ===
The state's ecosystems influenced the movement of the semi-nomadic Archaic Indian. The land gradually changed from a tundra to an evergreen forest, and eventually to forests of oak, hemlock, rhododendron, nut, berries, and Appalachian mixed mesophytic forests. The vegetation attracted modern game animals by 7800 BCE. Modern decididuous forests grew south and east of the Allegheny River. Carbonized nut hulls from the St. Albans Site in Kanawha County date to 7000 BCE.

The New River (Kanawha River) flows from the Ridge and Valley Province, and the head of the Tennessee River, (Powell, Clinch and Holston Valleys) and drains southwesterly through the Ridge and Valley Province. The upper branches of the Big Sandy River drain this province's northern slopes. While emptying near the mouth of the Ohio River, the Tennessee River and north Cumberland River reaches from the west-draining Cumberland Plateau opposite the Big Sandy watershed. The Tennessee River reaches easterly to the Ridge and Valley Province of the Great Smoky Mountains, part of the Blue Ridge Mountains. The Potomac River, James River, and Dan River basins drain the eastern slopes of these mountain ranges. Ancient mountain trails through eastern Kentucky and West Virginia allowed Native American passage between the northern Till Plains of Illinois, Indiana, and Ohio, and the Piedmont Plateau and Atlantic Ocean coastal plains. Trails through the region facilitated migration, trade, warfare, and hunting.

Between 10,800 and 9500 BCE, the continental glaciers retreated north of the Great Lakes. Glacial lake outburst floods occurred during the melt outflow. Flooding disturbed archaeological layers of lithics and ceramics in the alluvium of the south branch of the Potomac at the Romney bridge replacement archaeological site. Early Lake Erie, which was Lake Michigan and Lake Erie combined, flowed west out from Little River (Great Black Swamp proglacial lake's drainage embayment) and the Wabash River, before changing direction to the east into Glacial Lake Iroquois. Earlier sediments built up event outbursts, near the Little River, more than once which altered the drainage direction and the remaining Great Black Swamp. 3000 years ago, Lake Michigan and Lake Erie assumed their present shapes. Lake Erie's water level was similar to Lake Nipioing phase of Lakes Michigan and Huron basins 5,000 years ago. By 3500 years ago, the level had lowered by four meters and by 2000 years ago the level had increased to possibly five meters above today's levels. The Hopewell culture arrived from the north in west central Ohio and Indiana at least 2000 years ago. Earlier trading peoples also from the north, a vanguard Armstrong variant, in southwest West Virginia mingled peacefully with Late Adena peoples. Cold-worked copper from the pits in Wisconsin Old Copper Complex region have been found in some Adena mounds. The Upper Ohio Valley was experiencing the Sub-Atlantic climatic phase (3000–1750 years ago) of warm and moist climatic conditions and stable stream levels upon the occurrence of the Hopewell culture. This climatic phase began after the much earlier appearance of indigenous Early Adena culture (1735 BCE) in West Virginia.

=== Paleoclimatology ===
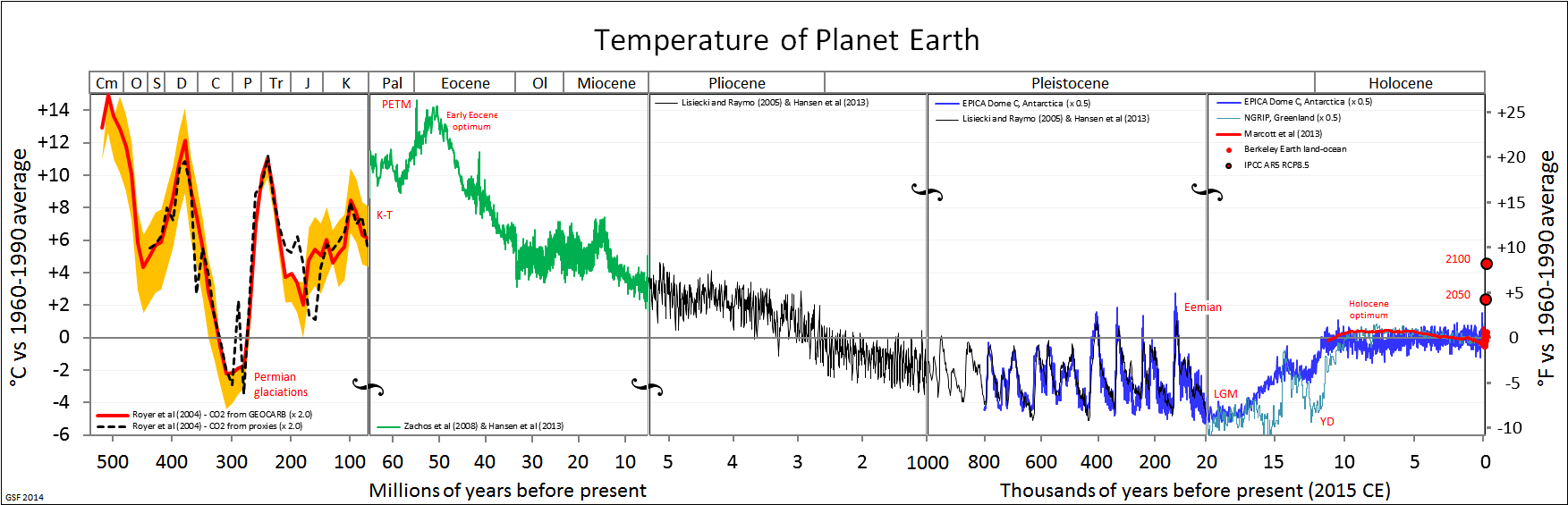

Paleoclimatology is the study of prehistoric weather. The Eemian interglacial period spanned 130,000–114,000 years ago. The Laurentide Ice Sheet covered much of Canada and the northern United States from 95,000 and 20,000 years before present. The last advancement of glacial ice sheets in the eastern United States was the Wisconsin Glacial Episode, which caused the ice sheet to advance, and ended 10,000 years ago.

This freezing period temporarily stopped the ice sheets north of the Great Lakes from thawing. It is called the Younger Dryas Stadial, dating from 10,800 to 9500 BCE. Temperatures plunged seven degrees and the sea level sank 100 feet below present level. Nomadic Paleo-Indians arrived in the upper Ohio Valley utilizing Kanawha Black flint at this time. By 9500 BCE the Younger Dryas suddenly ended and warmer temperatures returned.

The warm period during between 7000 and 3000 BCE is called the Holocene climatic optimum. Towards the end of the Archaic period, seasonal weather was a time of Meridional overturning circulation and large storms came up from the Gulf of Mexico. The western and northern valleys of West Virginia became warm and dry with less precipitation around 2550 BCE, causing the bottom land flora to thin out and creating occasional major floods and serious erosion during the early part of this transitional weather pattern.

A period of drought was followed by a cool and wet Sub-Boreal climatic phase (4200–3000 BP), a warm and moist Sub-Atlantic climatic phase (3000–1750 BP), a Scandic climatic phase (1750–1250 BP), a stable Neo-Atlantic climatic phase (1100–750 BP), and a cool and wet Pacific climatic phase (750 BP, during the Little Ice Age).

The prevailing weather pattern in the Middle Ohio Valley from 1350 to 1600 CE was cool and wet, followed by a period of frequent drought. In contrast, the upper Ohio Valley experienced milder weather patterns. The frequency of droughts in West Virginia increased in the following decades. Drought frequency during 1250–1400 CE is unknown. North of the Allegheny Plateau, the Till Plains were less affected by drought.

Two periods mark the rise and decline weather for true agriculture: the Medieval Warm Period (800–1300 CE) and the Little Ice Age Period (1400–1900 CE).

== Paleo-Indian period ==
Paleo-Indian culture appeared by 10,500 BCE in West Virginia along the major river valleys and ridge-line gap watersheds. The New Trout Cave in Pendleton County has been studied by archaeologists since 1966 and is one of many Paleo-Indian cave shelters in the region. This ancient cave settlement is near Lake Maumee. Among the Megafauna of the region, a few American mastodon teeth have been found on the broader river bottoms in western West Virginia. Woolly mammoths, mastodons, and caribou lived in the Kanawha Valley but died off or migrated north as the climate warmed.

The Meadowcroft Rockshelter is less than a dozen miles from the Northern Panhandle of West Virginia. Kanawha Chert from West Virginia was found at Meadowcroft Rockshelter, Washington County, Pennsylvania. Kanawha Chert source is 183.4 miles (114 km) southwest of Meadowcroft. Paleo occupation has been dated from 11,320 to 14,225 BCE by radiocarbon dating.

Cactus Hill is another important early site in Virginia that is similar to Meadowcroft. Saltville (archaeological site) is also relevant to the same early cultural tradition.

Paleo-Indian Clovis culture peoples left fluted Clovis points in West Virginia. Plano cultures (8000–7000 BCE) created Clovis-knapped spear points lacking the groove or flute of the earlier Clovis Point. Plano peoples moved westward and hunted bison on the High Plains extending to Ohio and into the early Archaic time period. The Dalton tradition (8500–7900 BCE) represents another technical shift, characterized by a particular type of adze. The earliest stone point surface finds, like the Dalton variants (8700–8200 BCE), are very rare.

Paleo-Indians lived in eastern North America by 6000 BCE, and by 4000 BCE had clearly differentiated into two groups: the southern archaic Isawnid (Indian Knoll culture of Kentucky) and the northern archaic Lenid (Great Lakes Area) peoples

== Archaic period ==
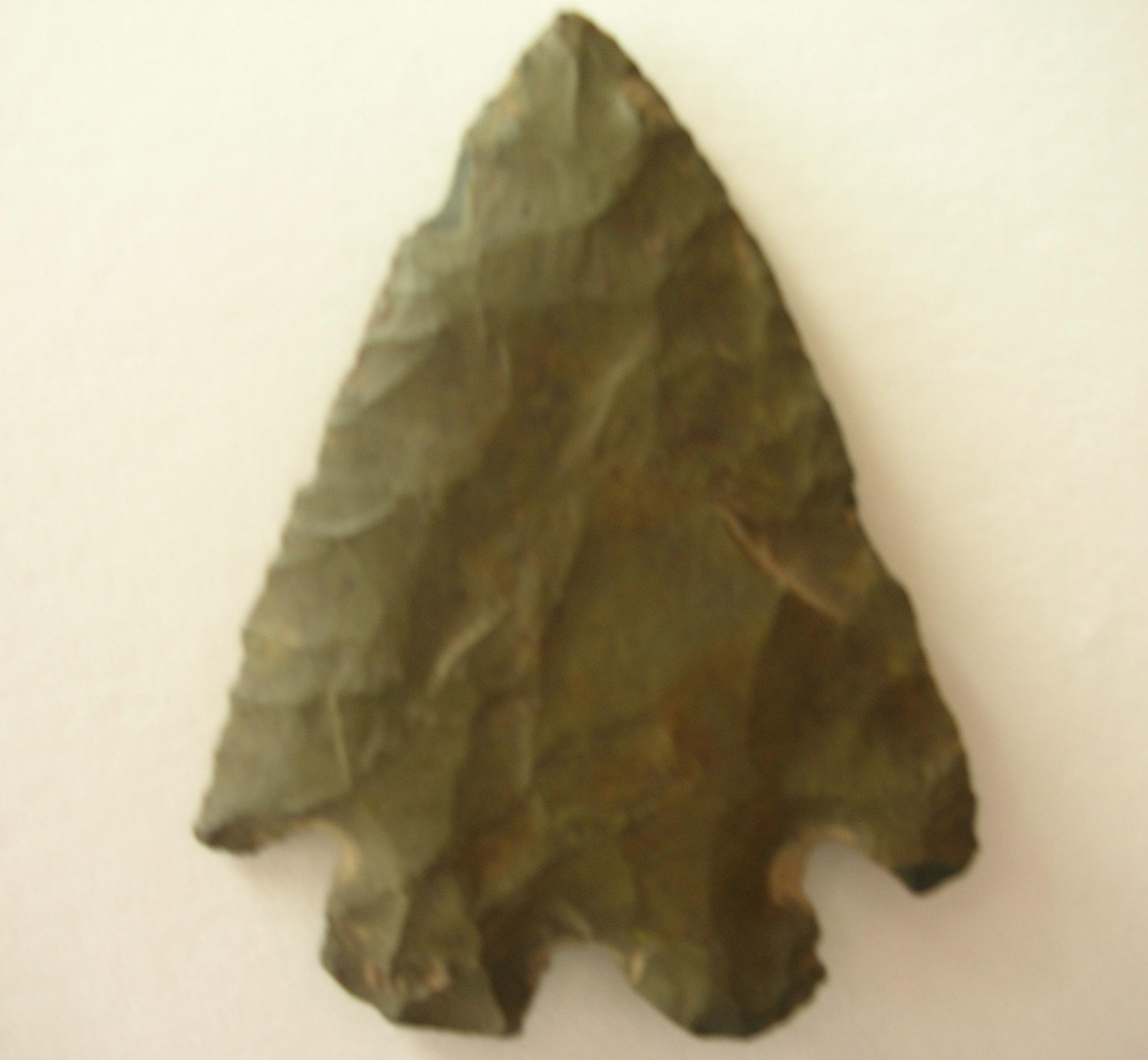
Early Archaic Lecroy Point, 6700–5700 BCE: West Blennerhassett Site (46Wd83-A) 6710 and 6285 BCE, Wood County; St. Albans site 6300±100 BCE, Kanawha County; Slade Site 6350±110 BCE, Sussex County, Virginia; Rose Island Site, Tennessee 6300 BCE Occurs from northern Alabama north to New York and into Ohio, Michigan and eastern Kentucky

The Archaic period, from 8000 to 2000 BCE, experienced warmer climates. Archaic peoples in West Virginia were hunter-gatherers, who fished and gathered wild berries, nuts, seeds, and wild plants. The megafauna had migrated or died out by this time, so people hunted deer, bear, wild turkeys, rabbits, and other small game with atlatls and small spears. The atlatls used elaborate stone weights called bannerstones. They used ground-stone implements and flint woodworking tools, as well as bowls of sandstone and soapstone, knives, and net sinkers. In Kanawha Valley, tools were made with Kanawha Black Flint. The Kessell Side Notched point at the St. Albans Site, dated to 7900 BCE, is an example of a rare, early archaic stone point.

The archaic stone point chronology in the Kanawha Valley is generally as follows:

- Kanawha Points of LeCroy Period (6200–6300 BCE)
- Stanley Period (ca. 5745 BCE)
- Amos Period (4365–4790 BCE)
- Hansford Period (3600–3700 BCE)
- Transitional Period (1000–1200 BCE).

Some Brewerton Phase side and corner-notched points (side-notched tradition) are often found resharpened, and some were modified as hafted end-scrapers. A few uncommon Pointed Pole Adzes are thought to have been used for heavy woodworking at one late northern Panhandle Archaic site (2000 BCE), where a dugout canoe has possibly been found.

=== Regional Archaic ===
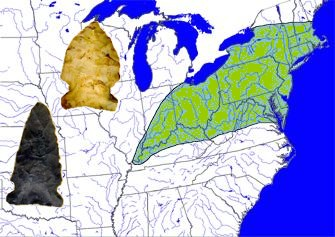
A Late Archaic atlatl point, "Brewerton Eared Notched", Distribution Map, 2980–1723 BCE.

The traditional Archaic sub-periods are Early (8000–6000 BCE), Middle (6000–4000 BCE), and Late Riverton Tradition. The Laurentian Archaic tradition includes the Brewerton phase, Feheeley phase, Dunlop phase, McKibben phase, Genesee phase, Stringtown/Satchel phase, Satchel phase, and Lamoka/Dustin phase.

The Red Ocher people and Glacial Kame culture evolved together resulting in the following traits.

1. Small gravel mounds (drainage-way sedimentary) at first of the Glacial Kame
2. The introduction of red ocher in burials
3. Animal masks and headdresses
4. Medicine bags
5. Conical tubular pipes
6. Grooved axes
7. Atlatls now with atlatl weights for better leverage
8. Cremation accretion on conical mounds ending the era.

Sometime after 2000 BCE, people built large conical mounds with casks made of small logs at the base. Small conical gravel mounds quickly grew in size as Early Eastern Woodland people, known as the Adena moundbuilders arrived from the east.

== Site numbering system ==
Today, commercial complexes and highway construction sites require a geological and archaeological survey (industrial archeology and bioanthropology) before building can begin. Archaeologists and anthropologists identify the state's investigative "dig sites" using a standardized nomenclature. The first element of this system is the state's National "ID" number which for West Virginia is "46". The second element is the county in which the site is located, an abbreviation. For example, the 1st site in Mingo County is site 46MO1, Cotiga Mound, listing a Woodland burial mound dating to 1400 BCE on the Tug Fork of the Big Sandy River. Another example, Marshall County's site number seven is an Adena culture mound (1735 BCE) called Cresap Mound, 46MR7. Burning Spring Branch site #142 in Kanawha County would be 46KA142, a site listed as having a multiple occupation of a Fort Ancient Village and a historic stratum.

== Woodland period ==
The Woodland period spanned 1000 BCE to 1000 CE. The Woodland period is differentiated from the Archaic Period by the emergence of agriculture, cord- or textile-marked pottery, and burial mounds.

=== Adena culture ===
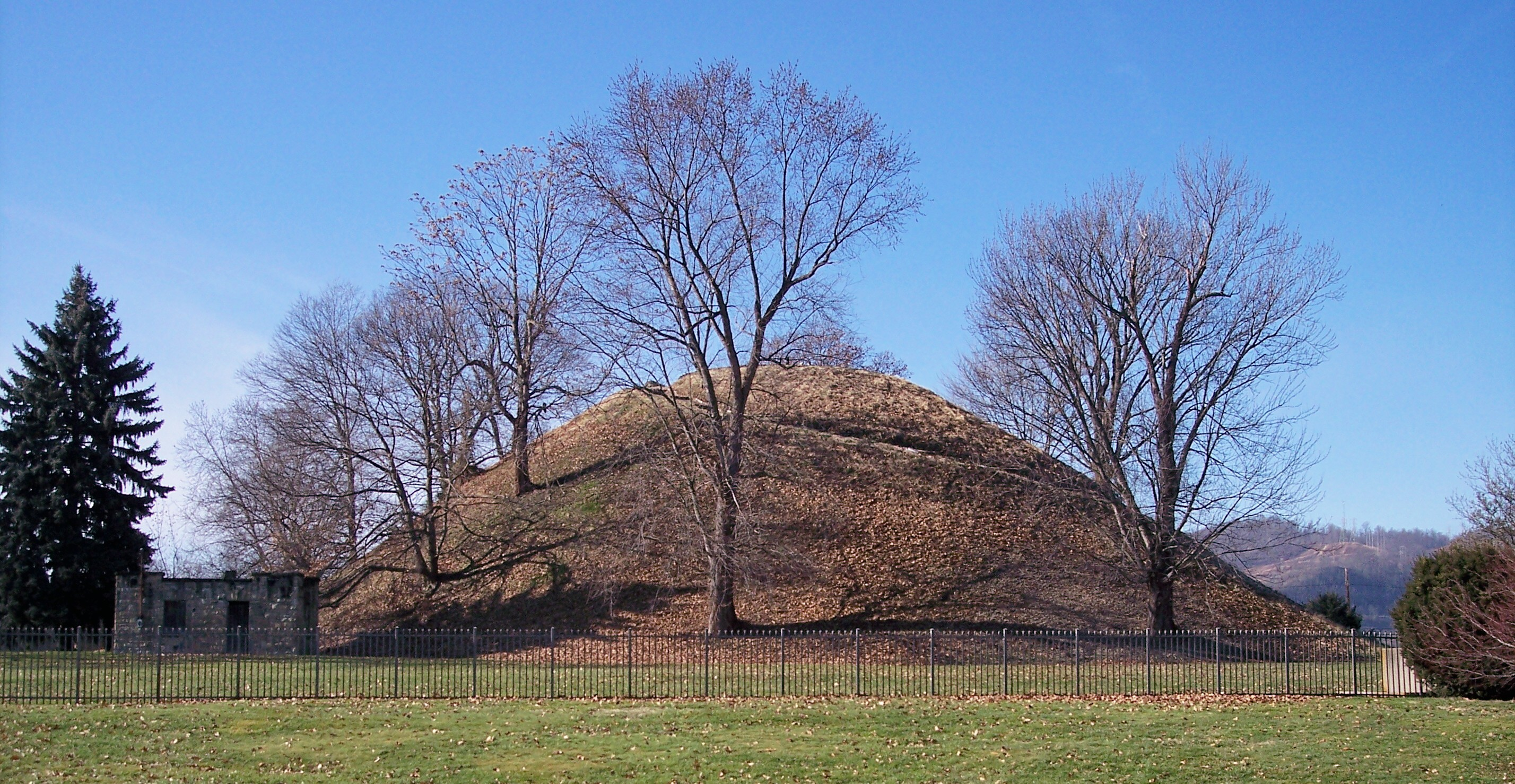
Grave Creek Mound (250–150 BCE)

The Adena culture, which originated in Ohio, flourished from 1000 to 200 BCE in West Virginia. Adena people practiced agriculture and lived in settled villages. At its cultural zenith, Adena villages spread throughout the Midwestern United States and were self-governing and loosely linked by trade.

Adena houses typically were conical structures, about 15–45 feet in diameter, and built around supporting poles, either single or double. Roofs were made of bark and walls could be wickerwork or bark.

Adena crops are part of the Eastern Agricultural Complex. They grew squash, sunflower (Helianthus annuus), sumpweed, goosefoot, knotweed, and maygrass. Gourds were grown for containers and rattles. What might be a small bird pen found at one Adena site suggests limited animal domestication, but Adena people are not known for animal husbandry.

Tobacco was an important crop and was smoked in effigy pipes. Turtles, ducks, and other animals were represented in Adena art. A limited amount of copper was imported from the western Great Lakes region, and marine shells were imported from the Gulf of Mexico.

Adena nobles wore tanned heads of animals during their ceremonies. They wove coarse cloth, colored with natural dyes. Red ochre was placed in elite graves. They altered their appearance with cranial deformation. Cordage was spun from sinew, hide, and fibrous plants.

During the last few centuries of the Adena zenith (500 BCE), a second horizon with more political cohesion (a Priest Cult) arrived in a mass invasion above the Ohio River. Late Adena people fled south of the Ohio, joining their kindred, and some continued to flee as far as the Chesapeake Bay traditional trade area. A few fled towards the easterly Point Peninsula Woodland culture or the Eastern Great Lakes trade area. Their mounds progressively become smaller through Virginia. These soon assimilated with the regional Woodland People. The large conical Adena Turkey Creek Mound (46PU2) on the Great Kanawha dates to 886 CE.

These smaller family groups spread out within the state for four hundred years after the Adena Complex period. These Late Woodland people would see the eventual arrival of the bow and arrow.

=== Adena mounds ===
Many Adena mounds were burial sites. The deceased were often cremated and placed in log tombs, which would be covered with dirt, forming the basis of a conical mound.

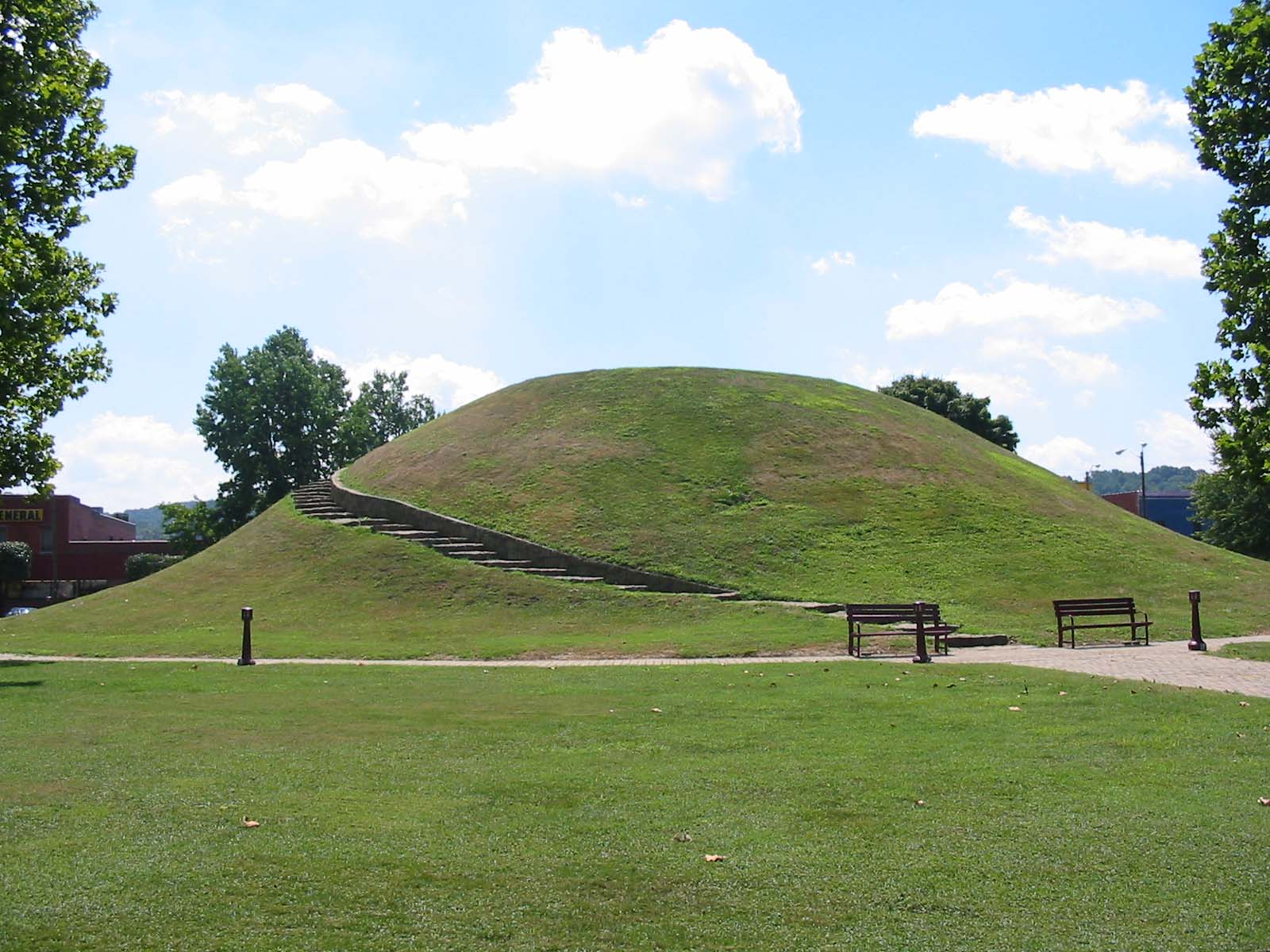
Criel Mound, South Charleston, West Virginia

Adena mounds in West Virginia include:

- Camden Park Mound, Cabell County
- Criel Mound, Kanawha County, 250–150 BCE
- Cresap Mound (46MR7), Marshall County, 1735 BCE
- Cotiga Mound (46MO1), on the Tug Fork of the Big Sandy River, Mingo County, 1400 BCE
- Grave Creek Mound, Moundsville, 250–150 BCE
- St. Albans Site (46KA27), Kanawha County
- Turkey Creek Mound (46PU2), Putnam County
- Goff Mound, Harrison County
- Lynden Reynolds Farm Mound, Pleasants County
- St Mary's Mound, Pleasants County

The Grave Creek Mound in Moundsville is the largest mound in the state and was once surrounded by a moat. Cresap Mound redefined what constitutes Early to Middle Adena culture (1000 BCE), as opposed to Late Adena (500 BCE).

== Other woodland cultures ==
Cincinnati is in the bluegrass region of Ohio contrasting the physiographic division called the 'unglaciated' Allegheny Plateau of steeper hills and cliffs shared by western West Virginia.

The Mid-Atlantic region cultural pattern is found early in West Virginia. An Early Woodland people from the east began to trade with the latest Archaic people. Early Woodland peoples established sites on floodplains, terraces, saddles, benches and hilltops. Storage or refuse pits in habitation sites appear. Analysis of a new style ceramic discovery from the Winfield Locks Site (46PU4) has provisional Early Woodland dates of 1500–400 BCE along the Kanawha shores.

The earliest ceramics of the region's Woodland Culture (1000 BCE–1250 CE) is called the Half-Moon Ware. There are now two known types of early ceramics of the Woodland Culture. It has been suggested that oval or circular structures were used as houses. In 1986, Grantz attempted to test in Fayette County, Pennsylvania several post mold arcs for a pattern to confirm the suggestion of early village houses. Despite earnest effort, it was not confirmed. The Middle (1–500 CE) and Late Woodland (500–1000 CE) Periods for the Northern Panhandle of West Virginia would include the Mid-western cultures of primarily Adena and Late Hopewell (1–500 CE) from McConaughy's (2000) research. "Nebulas" is a term to describe late Hopewellian—localizing societies. Later (650 CE), some Woodland would be alongside very Late Adena (46PU2) and assimilating on the Greater Kanawhan region. Burial ceremonials and mound construction gradually became smaller which has phased out by the end of the Woodland period. However, because tobacco was probably being grown and used, McConaughy in 1990 suggests the development of complex society. Early Woodland peoples lived a more settled existence.

'Fairchance Mound and Village' of Marshall County, West Virginia is a Middle Woodland complex. The mound artifacts carbon dates to the 3rd century CE. One of the tombs in the mound is unique in being a stone lined crypt. This "crypt" was simply a layer of "slab-stone" covering the mound with more dirt placed over the "sheets" of stone. This was not a "boxed-in crypt." This should not be confused with the centuries later Hadden Phase (1100–1600 CE) Hadden site (15To1) mortuaray complex (Allen 1977:14) stone box grave and stone slab-lined crematory cist of the Kentucky Western Coal Fields Section. The Fairchance village pottery included Watson Ware that was limestone-tempered. The stone points were Fairchance-notched and Snyders points. The foods found through screening were the semi-domesticated "wild plants" listed in the summary below for this period. The nearby Watson Farm village dated between 1600 and 1400 BP and its small, one-meter high mound also contained a stone crypt. The limestone tempered Watson Ware along with a limited amount of grit-tempered Mahoning Ware was found. Flotation samples were performed at this site, but, these have not been analyzed by botanical specialists. Either wild or domesticated Chenopodium, goosefoot, was found. These Middle Woodland people subsisted primarily on wild plants, animals, fish, and shellfish. Each site had a single circular structure found, which may be due to limited excavation.

Maize horticulture appears in the Late Middle Woodland (550–950 CE) and seems to be an "economy" crop.<ref=md56>McConaughy 2000, Dragoo 1956</ref> "Climbing beans" similar to today's Kentucky Wonders planted beside hills of maize (corn, Zea mays) appear in the Northern Panhandle and Monongahela drainage system by the 14th century. This is after the northern West Virginia and western Pennsylvania "Hamlet Phase" of the Monongahela culture (Monongahela Drew "tradition", R L George et al. of Pa) which transitions to Fort Farmers (1200 CE) now located on higher creek flats and ridge line gaps. The grit-tempered Mahoning Ware pottery becomes the primary ceramic form. Stone points, the Jack's Reef Corner Notched, Jack's Reef Pentagonal, Kiski Notched and Levanna, indicate that the "spear thrower", a common incorrect terminology for the atlatl and dart, was gradually replaced by the bow-and-arrow during the Late Middle Woodland. Both atlatls and the earliest bows and arrows were used in West Virginia at about this time frame.

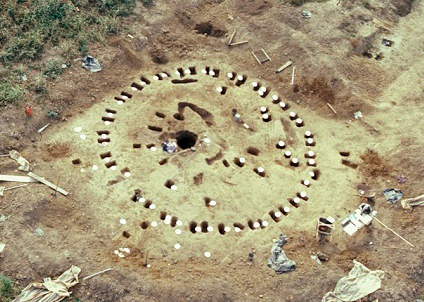
Adena ceremonial circle Neibert Mound site

Late Woodland people's wigwam settlements increased in size within relatively fixed territories. Late Woodland temporary hunting rock shelters increased the distance for procuring resources. Facing Monday Creek Rockshelter (33HO414) in Hocking County, Ohio documents this resource expansion process. The value of knowledge sharing across borders today can be shown by quoting one of several sources. In his 2006 abstract, Steven P. Howard sums up his field team's findings, "Elements of the Ohio Hopewell florescence are evident at the Caneadea (Allegheny County, New York) and other northeastern mounds, but direct Hopewell influence appears to have been minimal. Data from northeastern mounds indicate that Hopewell may not be appropriate as a universal label for Middle Woodland mound building cultures."

=== Latest Woodland ===
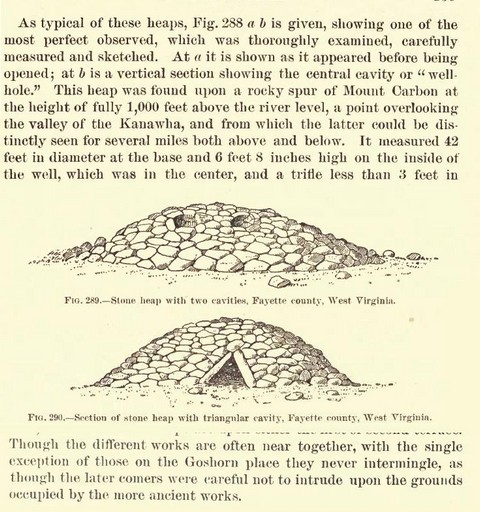
Kanawha Valley rock piles near earlier mounds

During the early Late Woodland period (350–750 CE), maize agriculture is rare. A 2010 analysis of a local stalagmite revealed that Native Americans were burning forests to clear land as early as 100 BCE. Maize agriculture became more commonplace during the Middle Woodland 400 BCE–400 CE, which also saw a flowering of Eastern Agricultural Complex, that is, the increased gardening of indigenous seed crops. Maize came from the southwest to the lower Mississippi Valley. Bean cultivation preceded maize in the upper Ohio Valley. The following Late Prehistoric Woodland people approached solving this problem with the development of the Three Sisters Crop method or companion seed sowing. As Dragoo explained, environment affected development in ways of human living. Walton C. Galinat researched maize cultivation in the Eastern United States. These studies include terrain altitude deviation (valley vs ridge flats and plateau frost days) daily temperature changes and the number of days for the growing season comparing variety of maize through time. Early varieties of maize needed considerably more growing days than eight-row maize. In New England maize was well established by 1200 CE and distributions of the Southern Dent Pathway established other varieties of maize after 1500 CE. "Maize (corn) did not make a substantial contribution to the diet until after 1150 B.P." wrote Mills (OSU 2003).

Watson pottery making people lived along the upper Ohio Valley from the Kanawha regions through the Northern Panhandle and adjoining state border area, which also extends into the Eastern Panhandle. Tobacco growing remained important among certain tribes, hunter gathering gardeners, hunter-fishery horticulturalist, and later hunter-fishery farmers of the region. Tobacco seed was extremely small and seldom found in screening results. Tobacco was evidenced by the many pipes and bowl residues found at certain sites rather than the seed itself. The arrival of the tomato in the region is thought to be historic, or proto-historic. Both the squashes and gourds long predate maize and beans in the state. The cereal maize surpassed the Woodland's cereals little barley and may grass as well as a wild rye in the genus Elymus.

Watson people (100–800 CE) generally lived on flats above the annual flooding of the major rivers, near their small conical mounds. Their dominant pottery preference was decorated with a Z-twist cordage technique. This period signals an ending of large conical mounds northerly in and along the state. Here they arose adjacent to the Armstrong people and following Buck Garden on their south extent. The spanning duration and region Woodland type site is Watson 46HK34 (Woodland/Watson) located at Hancock County. Upon their horizon and zenith, there were no bean or maize seeds in the state. These were hunters and fishermen, but gardeners of a larger variety of indigenous seed crops, who were transitioning to just supplemental gathering of wild berries and nuts. The bean of the horticulturalists appeared sparsely in the area toward the ending of this period. About the time the Buck Garden arose, they were also found living in small compact villages. Their mounds were made partly with rocks, having more people buried within than earlier special person mounds.

Wood Phase was contemporaneous with Scioto Valley Tradition's earlier period of post-Hopewellian Cole Culture of central Ohio. Influence from the southeastern United States during late Cole period in Highland County, Ohio is manifest at the Holmes mound (1135 CE). The earlier of the period, the Voss mound (910 CE), was a ceremonial plaza.

Later horticulture in the greater Kanawhas region, like the Watson before them, are in camps found above the flood terrace but with linear and dispersed household groups. Charles M. Niquette explains his associates finding (46MS103) "Niebert's circular structures are the first well documented Adena structures to be found apart from mound contexts in the Ohio Valley." Niebert Site (46MS103) yielded important evidence of use by Late Archaic, Middle Woodland (Adena) and Late Woodland peoples (CRAI). The Late Woodland component in Cabell County, 46CB42 Multi-component, was more similar to Woods and Niebert than to Childers. This component was more similar to people in the interior Southeast than to those in the mid-Ohio Valley of central Ohio and northern Kentucky (McBride & Smith 2009). Small sherds of Woods phase pottery can easily be mistaken for Parkline pottery (O’Malley 1992). This period seems to be a peaceful trade era for the Woodland cultures of the region. The Fort Ancient hamlet and companion crop fields era, beginning with (46WD1) Blennerhassett Island Mansion (891–973 CE), differentiate the Late Woodland Wood Phase of the Eastern Agricultural Complex in west-central West Virginia.

Hopewell at Romney Mound on Tygart Valley appears to be a distinct variant. It occurred during the neighboring Watson through Buck Garden period to their south and westerly in the state. However, this very late Hopewellian arrival of a particular small conical mound 'religion' appears to be already waning in the daily living activities at these sites. This period begins a rapid fading away of influence by an elite priest cult burial phase centered towards the Mid-west states. However evolved, they were present with the earliest Monongahelan. This area is a portion of the greater Montane.

Montane (500–1000 CE) locations include the tributaries of the Potomac on the Eastern Panhandle region which also was influenced by the Armstrong culture and Virginia Woodland people. Their traits are described as blurred. The Late Woodland Montane was less influenced by Hopewellian trade coming from Ohio. Yet by Romney, similarly polished stone tools have been found among the Montane sites in the Tygart Valley. Small groups of remnant Montane people appear to have lingered much beyond their classic defined period in parts of the most mountainous valleys of the state. What little is known of the Montane is from the early work of the Smithsonian. Their area is within the much less developed of the state, forest and parks, requiring little immediate required field work. Neighboring south the Incipient Intermontane (CE 800–1200) followed by the Full Montane (1200~1625 CE) are found in the Ridge and Valley provence in western Virginia (Blue Ridge) and SW West Virginia border area to upper border area of W North Carolina.

Wilhelm culture (Late Middle Woodland, 1–500 CE) appeared in the Northern Panhandle. "An excavation in Brooke County first drew attention to the distinctive practice of the Wilhelm people of building small mounds over individual stone-lined graves and then fusing several graves together into a single large mound". These had a Hopwellian influence. Although not as well made, their pottery compares well with coexistent Armstrong pottery. Fragments of pipes appear to be of the platform type. These less studied rural environs of early small rock mound building requires more work. 'Monogahelan-like' later arose next to the atlatl and dart using Wilhelm area. Watson people were also in this area. South of the Northern Panhandle, the Woods Phase followed the Watson people.

Armstrong culture (Woodland, 1–500 CE) practiced cremation and built small mounds central to the Big Sandy Valley. They are thought to be a variant of Hopewell, a Middle Woodland influenced from an earlier culture who peacefully mingled with the Adena mix, or an intrusive Hopewell-like trade culture or a vanguard of Hopewellian who probably peacefully absorbed some Adena through to the Great Kanawha Valley area. Here, this period is of the accretion by cremation or enlarging of the mounds. Their clay pottery has a glazed yellow-orange color as described within this article. Their villages appear to be scattered over a large area with small round houses. Their limited garden was compared to Adena. Small flaked knives and corner notched points were often flint ridge material. Sometimes called Vanport Chert, this material is from the greater Muskingum River valley area cited in the later Stone Industry chapter. They slowly evolved into the Buck Garden people.

Buck Garden (500–1200 CE) were predominant throughout central Kanawha-New River Valley region following the upper Armstrong. They were first identified at the Buck Garden Creek site in Nicholas Co. Buck Garden people were buried under Rock Mounds and cliffs. They lived in compact villages and began raising beans included within the Eastern Agricultural Complex method. Many illustrations of living activities in print through the decades have been suggested. These ideas have ranged from the bizarre to the probable. They grew or gathered root and ground vining foods, picked spring greens, berries and ramp followed by gathering shellfish on creek flats, hickory and walnuts. Use of spice and Sassafras is presently speculative. With their fishing pike, they fished the spring run and in the following cooler leafless seasons they hunted game. Like their rock mound burial within the state's interior, their use of rocks is not clear: small fishing jetties and possible use of the curious game-herding stone walls. Dr. Otis K. Rice wrote, "About 1000 A. D. the Buck Garden hill people began to occupy the Mount Carbon site."

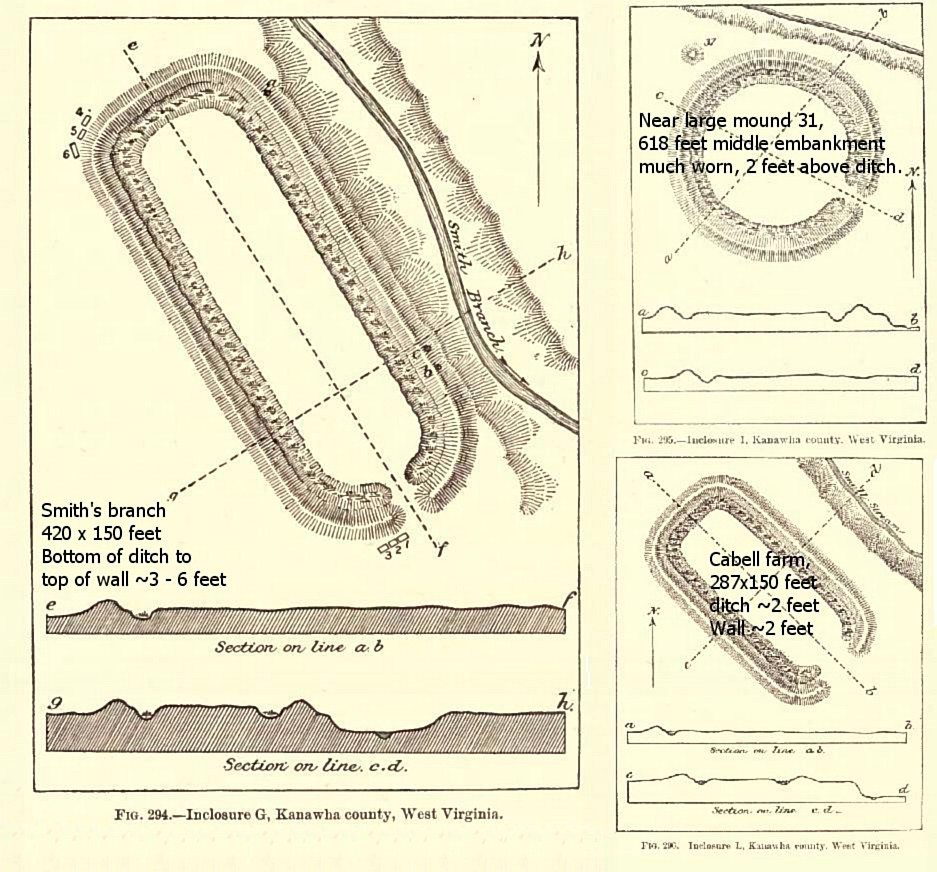
Early archaeological village sites on the Kanawha Valley, sites destroyed. One of the rectangular stone graves contained two hemetite celts, four small flint knives, and one lance head. Grave 5 had 22 flint knives with the greatly decayed skeleton. No "arrow heads" were reported.

Childers phase occupation at multiple strata Parkline Site (46PU99), Putnam County, West Virginia, is most likely associated with populations living in the Scioto Valley of Ohio of early Late Woodland, around 400 CE (CRAI 2009). This has a compact cluster of thermal features and storage or refuse pits. Houses are not identified. Woodland houses are generically described as small wigwam. At the Winfield Locks Site (46PU4) possible oval structures were suggested. Like the Parkline, this reflects cultural intrusions into the lower Kanawha Valley by small, highly mobile groups.

Parkline phase (750~1000 CE), intrusive Late Woodland, appearance on the Kanawha Valley is found at site 46PU99 (1170–1290 CE), a multi-component site in Putnam county. It is represented by numerous thermal features, including large, rock-filled earth ovens on the Kanawha Valley having its origin on the northeast Atlantic Seaboard dating to 900 CE. Their decorative pottery attributes are grit-tempered pottery with folded rim strips, cordwrapped paddle edge impressions placed on vessel collars and lip notching and/or cord wrapped dowel impressions. Parkline phase "are thought to be inhabited for very brief periods of time by highly mobile, nuclear family groups." Parkline phase's region extends up the Ohio River from Louisville, Kentucky to Point Pleasant, West Virginia, and along the Ohio's major tributaries as defined here. No Parkline phase sites with intensive human occupation have been found in West Virginia.

Anthropologist Anna Hayden writes, "However, somewhere in the Middle Woodland (ca. 400 BCE–900 CE), these large-scale trading systems seem to collapse, ending the cultural continuity that had existed for some time (Custer 1994)." Algonquian speakers from the Great Lakes region likely began migrating into the Middle Atlantic region around 100 or 200 CE. Their dominant pottery preference was decorated with a S-twist cordage technique. As many as six peoples shared a short period of transitioning in West Virginia. The earliest hamlet village farmers of Fort Ancient and Monongahela were concurrent with the latest Wood, Parkline, Montane and Buck Garden peoples for relatively short passage of time to a new way of living in the state using shell tempered pottery with variational pottery decorations and bow with arrows.

Excavated sites are surrounded by other unstudied sites, believed to be traveling hunter's camps. A hunter's camp near 13 Mile Creek, with the Panther Petroglyph (46Ms81) is not assigned to a phase.

=== Hopewell mounds ===
- Romney Indian Mound, Hampshire County, 500–1000 CE
- Oak Mounds, Harrison County, 1–1000 CE

=== Eastern Panhandle, Potomac Valley ===
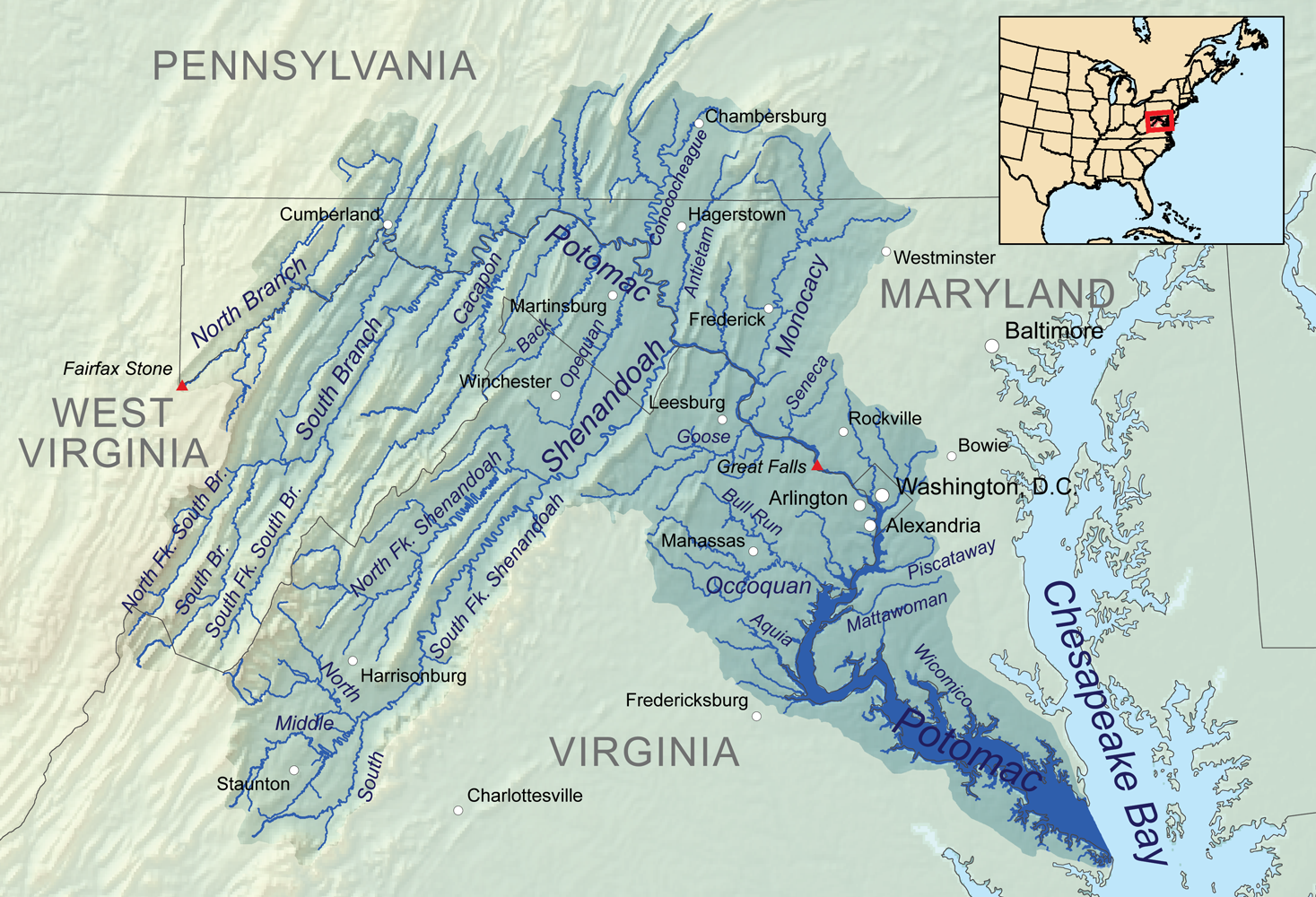
Potomac watershed showing WV Eastern Panhandle orientation.

The Mockley phase of Middle Woodland dates from 40 CE of the Norfolk, Virginia region of the lower Chesapeake Bay. These people generally lived in smaller encampments as they fished and clammed. A few storage pits have been identified (Potter 1994). They had limited gardening, as recent findings suggest they included the sunflower which predates the large-scale Mesoamerican influence in the Carolinas and Virginia.

Mason Island culture, an agricultural village complex, pottery is a newly defined pottery type now being called Page Plain along with a few sherds of Page Cord-marked ware in very limited numbers compared to the limestone-temper. Although a little too early in the state to be so named, a precursor Levanna Triangle tipped their arrows. Mason Island phase sites are also referred to as Page phase, as sometimes known in west Maryland. This should not be confused with the Page phase (900–1100 CE), a western Kentucky primarily mortuary complex at Page site at Logan County, Kentucky of the Mississippian culture.

The Mason Island's Page phase is one of three Late Woodland cultural subdivisions known in the Monocacy River area just before European contact from Alleghany county. "The New River Drainage and upper Potomac (Potomac Highlands) represents the range of the Huffman phase (Page pottery) hunting and gathering area or when it is found in small amounts on village sites, trade ware or Page women being assimilated into another village (tribe)." They had occupied the upper Potomac to the northern, otherwise, lower Shenandoah Valley region before the arrival of Luray phase people in 1300 CE. Mason Island people were pushed to the west Piedmont, as about this time the Potomac Creek complex appeared in the coastal plain of the Potomac River.

Luray phase is characterized by shell-tempered Keyser Cord-marked pottery; small, isosceles Madison points and palisaded, agricultural villages. These pushed out the Mason Island complex central Potomac Valley by 1300 CE to the neighboring areas including up the Eastern Panhandle rivers of the Montaine Culture people and New River drainage neighbors of Bluestone Phase (Jones 1987). Luray Phase were of an Algonquian dialect (Potter, 1994). Neighboring in Maryland, the Luray Complex dates to 1250–1450 CE. The youngest within the Maryland Accokeek Creek site (1300–1650 CE) is associated with the historic Piscataway people.

The Rappahannock complex is of the Late Woodland of the Lower Potomac River basin of 900–1700 CE. It is not clearly defined, although there are two temporal phases—Late Woodland I and Late Woodland II (Fitzthugh 1975:112) Generally, their pottery was shell-tempered and similar to Townsend Ware pottery. Earlier phase, these people increasingly utilized smoked oysters, stored them and increasingly traded them further inland. Temporary oyster gathering sites suggest that they also divided their seasons according to agriculture (Potter, 1994). Townsend ceramics were considered to be trade items associated with the Potomac Creek complex trade coming from the Algonquian Delmarva Peninsula (Custer, 1986) and Slaighter Creek Complex (Baker).

The Montgomery complex (900–1450 CE) were a Late Woodland people on the Piedmont Potomac Valley. They would take refuge to the James River by the middle of the 13th century with others from the greater Carolinas region. They were similar to the Carolina Algonquians who had been living there (S lower lands) for a duration of nearly six hundred years. There appears to be a coalescing with the late Potomac Creek complex evidenced by the building of fortified villages along the Chesapeake Bay and Piedmont plains. It is thought building these "forts" was a defence from Iroquois language groups coming and going to the region.

Potomac Creek complex on the "Neck of the Potomac" valley may date as early as 1200 CE, although clearly by the late 14th century. Their house shape seems to be rectangular with the one example having a round end. (Schmitt 1965:8) A longhouse was clearly defined at two different villages. Their obtuse-angle clay pipes are similar to those found on the various Delmarva Peninsula complexes of coastal Maryland and Virginia, to northeast North Carolina. Schmitt had earlier defined this kind of pipe to this particular complex and maintained this position in 1963. Another early Schmitt assigned supposedly unique trait of the later Potomac Creek was the human style shell maskettes having the "weeping eye" motif. "Shell mask gorgets with weeping eye designs are commonly found in East Tennessee, northeast Arkansas, and the middle Ohio Valley on sites dating to the Protohistoric period or just prior to it, quoting David Pollack, Kentucky Heritage Council. Potomac Creek dates from 1300–1700 CE.

"It is a mistake to assume that these language families (Iroquoian and Algonquian) can be extended backwards in time unchanged for several or more millennia, or that the speakers of these languages remained unchanged and stationary in their original homelands."

=== Monongahelan and Fort Ancient tradition ===
Late Prehistoric cultures (1200–1550 CE) are suspected to have, within them, dialectal or language differences. Commonly found at these small farming hamlets and later log palisaded villages are shell hoes, ceramic pipes, bone fishhooks, shell-tempered pottery, triangular arrow points, shell beads, and bone beads. Early and Middle Fort Ancients phases lived in their villages year round (Peregrine & Ember 2002:179), a common practice of others later in the state. Though unseen in West Virginia, some houses in the central Ohio Valley would have mud daubed sides similar to Mississippian according to Peregrine and Ember publishing of 2002. Lynne P. Sullivan writes of Mississippian influenced east Tennessee, "There is little evidence for interaction between Upper Cumberland people and Fort Ancient groups that lived along the Kentucky and Big Sandy rivers to the north and east. In fact, the Upper Cumberland region appears to mark the northern margin of the Mississippian "world" in this part of the southeast."

Monongahela-style stemmed stone pipes have been found among a few southeast Fort Ancient sites, including Orchard and Man, and Mount Carbon, although there appears to be no Monongahelan Monyock Cord-impressed ceramic pipes at Fort Ancient sites. Shell-tempered pipes are probably not Iroquoian, as found at the Clover site and one of the two fragments from the Buffalo site. A pipe found at the Hardin site near the Big Sandy has an etching of a lizard. These sites are in the southwest part of the state.

==== Drew tradition ====
Drew tradition (900–1350 CE) represents a separate cultural entity as Richard L George of the Society for Pennsylvania in 2006 explained. Before the 14th century CE log-palisaded villages period, agrarian hamlets appear about 900 CE in N West Virginia and the W Pennsylvania area. These farmers are found peacefully during the warmer weather era on the larger bottom lands of the major trade route rivers. The houses tended to be circular in shape or wigwam. Their pottery differs from following pushed-to-upper tributaries defensive Monongahelan, now having larger "bag shaped" or tear-drop bottom pottery, in a harsher era with colder weather. The contemporary Mahoning ware people, suspected to have been earlier influenced by late Hopewellian, also differs on the upper Ohio Valley (Mayer-Oakes 1955:193). Predating classic Mississippian influence at a great distance down river (Pauketat, 1050 CE "Big Bang" of Cahokia), George describes Drew pottery as like a "bean pot" or "more squat." Early Fort Ancient tradition sedentary hamlet crops Roseberry phase were adjoining southerly in the Little and Greater Kanawha region as were Feurt phase (46WD35, 1028–1720 CE).

==== Monongahelan ====
Monongahela tribe roots are in farm fields and hamlets with no palisading walls, on the major broad river valleys following the late Watson people. The Worley village Complex (46Mg23), Monongalia County, West Virginia, dates to about CE 900. To quote the Maryland Archaeological Conservation Lab, "Monongahela ceramics are a complex series that begin with an early grit or limestone tempered group and end with a very anomalous collection of types found in southwestern Pennsylvania during the post-Contact period." Their canal coal pendants are found from the Great Kanawha through to just the southwest corner of Pennsylvania protohistoric Monongahelan. After 1300 CE, there is evidence of inter-village warfare as the climate cools. Now being pushed, their circular villages become palisaded and move near ridge gaps. These villages were smaller and the artifacts are of a less variety than at Fort Ancient. Houses were generally circular in shape often with nook or storage appendage. Late Monongahela (1580–1635 CE) develops a charnel house of a shaman burial at a few villages, according to the Monongahela Chapter of the West Virginia Archaeological Society.

Differing characteristics between Fort Ancient and interior Monongahelan of West Virginia, "A reflection of the Monongahela's greater Woodland heritage was the continued use of small stone mounds in the Monongahela drainage area, well into the Late Prehistoric." A further difference in their palisaded villages were bastions or shooter's platforms and a maze-like entrance, sometimes covered. Late Monongahelan were likely middlemen in a marine shell trade network, extending from the Chesapeake Bay to Ontario. In 2005, the Haudenosaunee repatriated soil and associated funerary objects from the Fort Hill Site, which they reinterred on their tribal land.

In a 1978 abstract, comparing McFate Artifacts at the McJunkin site with Johnston and Squirrel Hill sites in western Pennsylvania, Richard L. George states, "It was suggested that the McFate presence on the McJunkin site may have been the result of foreign potters, namely women, living among the resident Monongahela... and suggests a major population movement from the north in the 16th century and an amalgamation of peoples speaking dissimilar languages." During this century Stadacona and Hochelaga (Jacques Cartier 1535–1536) had disappeared, and the tribes along the shores of the St. Lawrence were no longer those of Huron-Iroquois stock, but Algonquian (Journ, 183–84; Clev. ed XXXVIII, 181). To quote Richard L. George of the Pennsylvania Archaeology Society, "I believe that some of the Monongahela were of Algonquin origin... Other scholars have suggested that Iroquoian speakers were interacting with Late Monongahela people, and additional evidence is presented to confirm this. I conclude that the archaeologically conceived term, Monongahela, likely encompasses speakers of several languages, including Siouan."

==== Ancient tradition ====
Fort Ancient tradition flourished from about 1000 CE through 1550 CE (Bryan Ward 2009:10–27). Today's scholars have determined these Central Ohio Valley farming villagers to be a non-Mississippian culture developing from within the region. The Fort Ancient of West Virginia and the upper Ohio Valley are known as Eastern Fort Ancient neighboring Western Fort Ancients. The latter is popularly published and earliest read by the general public, having the first type site first to be published. Following discoveries can either be younger or older sites compared to the first one identified. Varying natural resources across the geography and the different neighbors influence the tradition's peoples. The Ohio Historical Society shows the Fort Ancient tradition elements as: Madison phase, Anderson phase, Feurt phase, Baldwin phase, Brush Creek phase, Baum phase, Philo phase, Clover complex, Holcombe complex, Crowfield complex, Barnes complex, Gainey complex, Enterline/Lux complex. Various Fort Ancient tradition sites along the Kanawha Valley include: Roseberry, Shadle, Threemile Creek, Somers, Buffalo, Wells, Clifton, Marmet (46KA9 Clover) and Marmet Bluffs (46KA7 Feurt), Pratt, Brownstown, Burning Spring Branch, Mt. Carbon and Barker's Bottom; on the Guyandotte Valley: Gue, Logan and Mann sites, and the Dingess village nearby on the Tug Fork-Levisa Fork of the Big Sandy. Sites can be found on the New River and the bordering rivers of Big Sandy and Ohio rivers.

Blennerhassett phase of the Fort Ancient tradition appears by 1250 CE. These people extend from the Mouth of the Little Kanawha area and began a few centuries before the Orchard people appear. They no longer utilized small burial mounds. The graves are now found amongst the houses surrounding the central plaza. Houses tended to be rectangular with round corners or oval in shape and were semi-subterranean with compacted floors. These people would become adept in palisading their circular villages with logs. This period shows a marked increase in maize diet than the earlier domesticated grasses or cereals of the preceding hamlet farmer. They continued to hunt small mammals, birds, fish, mollusks, elk, and white-tail deer. They follow the Roseberry phase (Brose et al. 2001:70,85. CE 1050–1250) also north from the Great Kanawha.

The Feurt phase (46WD35, 1028–1720 CE) ranges along the Ohio Valley from the Little Kanawha River and lower Muskingum River down both shores and environs to the Guyandotte River and from here their area reaches across the Ohio River to the lower Scioto River in Ohio. Flint Ridge (Vanport cherts), Hughes River flint, and Kanawha flint were found at these sites. Hobson site 33Ms-2 (1100–1200 CE) is of Fort Ancient tradition. The most diagnostic type of pottery found (plain, shell tempered rim sherds with punctate and incised decoration, with thick, crude, often punctate strap handles with castellations or raised rim areas), quoting James L. Murphy, "the material... seems to fit best the known characteristics of the type Feurt Plain." The major occupation is considered to fall rather early in the Feurt phase. A radiocarbon date of 1350 CE has been reported. The Roseberry Farm site (46MS53) is a Feurt phase (ca. 1046–1616 CE (CRAI)) people's location across the Ohio River from the Hobson site and about six miles away. Lewis Old Town site (46MS57) dates at 1398 CE, located near the Roseberry Farm site. Additional Feurt locations are along the shores of the Ohio.

Bluestone phase (Fort Ancient tradition, highland farmers) is of Southern West Virginia easternmost Cumberland (La Posta Volume 38 No 2 variously, Waseoto, Osioto, Osiata, Oseoto, and Onosiota) and south Allegheny valley's watershed. These sites are of the New River (Bluestone and Greenbrier valleys) Fort Ancient tradition component called, Bluestone spanning dates from 1028 to 1463 CE/ Jones studied 46SU3 (Barker's Bottom, 11–15th centuries CE, 46SU22 (blank, 1431, 1421); 46MC1 (Snidow,11th–14th centuries), 46SU9 (Island Creek, dated 1302 and 1286 CE). The area ranges from Summers through McDowell Counties into the adjoining southwest Virginia tributaries of the upper New River system.

==== Protohistoric ====
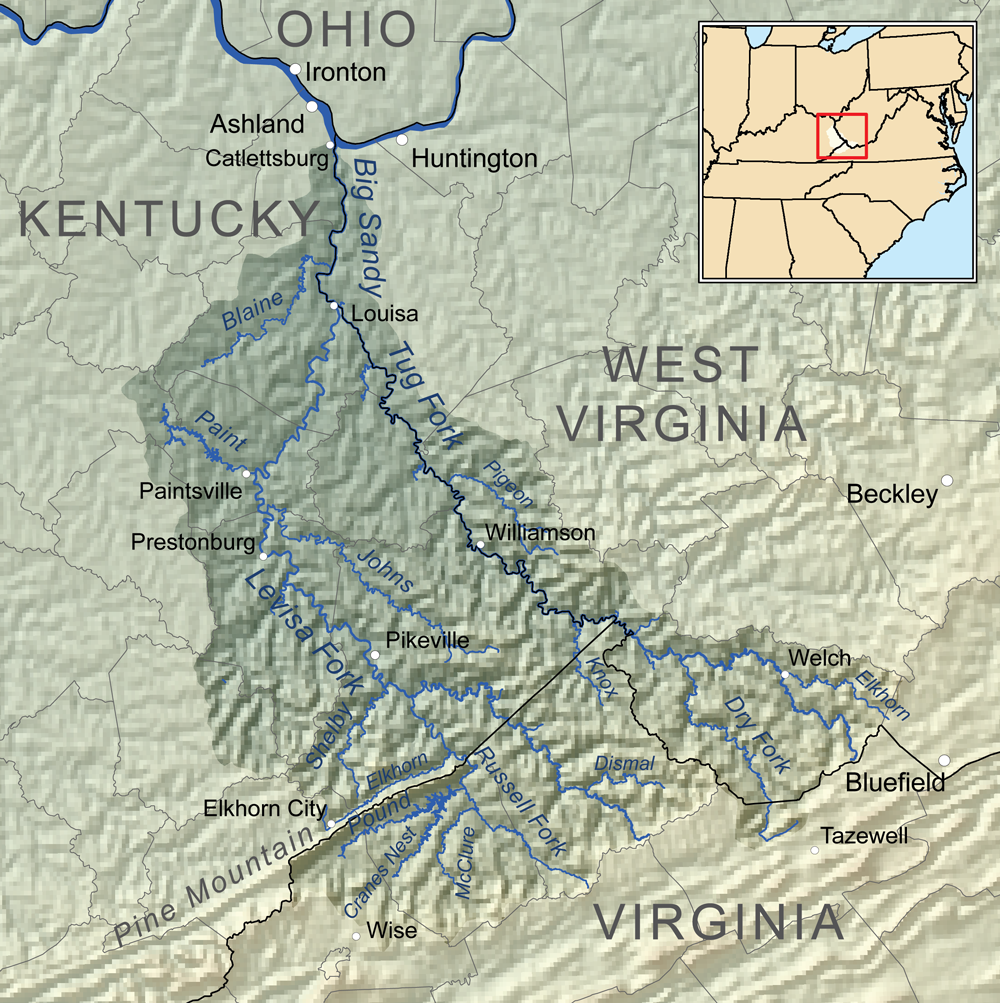
Tug Fork and Levisa Fork of the Big Sandy, Dingess village is near Louisa

The Clover phase area lies in the west of the state. The Clover Complex spans Putnam, Mason and Cabell counties along the lower Great Kanawha and Ohio rivers overlapping a central area of the older west-central Feurt phase. The type site is the Clover site (46CB40). Clover phase is divided into two phases, Early Clover dating 1450–1550 CE and Clover dates of 1550–1640 CE. It shares the Great Kanawha area with a couple of late Feurt villages. The Clover site (46CB40) is one of the most important sites found in the Kanawha Navigation Project.

== Bow and arrow ==
The introduction of the bow and arrow for hunting appears in the greater region by 500 CE (OHS) and clearly at village sites in West Virginia by 800–900 CE. The arrow was found to come from the north to the northwest valleys and to the East Allegheny Mountains slopes from the Piedmont Plateau. The Jacks Reef and Levanna are true early arrow points within the state. Jack's Reef Corner Notched (600–1200 CE, WVAS & WVCA) points are referred to as "Intrusive Mound" points.

Propagation of lithics was summarized by Dr. Oliver, NC Office of State Archaeology in 1999, "If a tradition of manufacture can be identified and substantiated by stratigraphic discoveries in a number of distinct locales, it is then possible to recognize that particular tradition of manufacture through time and across space. Intrusive technological traditions may also be recognized. Recognition of attributes common to a particular tradition allows the archaeologist to go beyond pigeon-holing and make more meaningful interpretations from these ancient pieces of stone."

Surface arrowhead hunting yields a wide variation of projectile points along the major trans-region thoroughfares in the state. Along the western routes of tributary streams, points made of material from SE Ohio and W Pennsylvania are some times found on the surface north from the Great Kanawha. The earlier concave base type, elongated Yadkin, dates 300 to 1300 CE. Both the long slender Serrated Western Fort Ancient and slightly shorter slender Caraway projectiles are considered rare in Appalachia. Another very similar small, slender long triangle of Piedmont Plateau Late Woodland called the Uwharrie projectile point type also follows the larger elongated Yadkin and early large Levanna.

The similar point, local southwest Altizer and some Feurt variants with hints of "ears" (Hamilton-like), also appear in central Ohio Valley and dates CE 1400 (Carmean 2009). These rare finds with edges flaring to the base, along the Blue Ridge border areas, also generally have concave bases or somewhat straight base not, as more often found, as dart points, for example the Hamilton. The casual collector in the state can find the small acute isosceles triangle point with a concave base made of varying flint and chert. The small Clements isosceles triangle point having either straight or concave base is very similar in Virginia and North Carolina. The southern surface collector's small late protohistoric Hillsboro resembles the earlier WV small levanna , spanning dates of 1200 to 1700 CE. A slightly larger triangle-like point, with no ears nor flaring leading edges to the base, precedes the isosceles triangle Hillsboro and is called the Clarksville. Those of small acute isosceles triangle, having either straight or concave base, made of Kanawha Black flint and Hughes River flint are commonly found at Late Prehistoric villages in West Virginia and south western Virginia. It is often simply called "a small Levanna" (WVAS).

Levanna and Yadkin points are made using antler percussion flaking (bifacial), rather than cruder flintknapping, and finalized with a pressure flaking technique. The latter technique is also used to resharpen earlier points, as some Madison types have been found. Both antler and bone lithic making tools are also commonly found among prehistoric West Virginia sites.

Using a similar flaking technique, the lighter Caraway Triangular point dominates at the time when the incised rattlesnake gorgets influence from northwest Tennessee and southwest Virginia are found in several burials at site 31SK15. Some Citico rattlesnake gorgets are also found late in the Clover Phase in West Virginia. Excavations at Site 31SK15 by Coastal Carolina Research, Inc. (page 14) indicate, "New ceramic styles may reflect interaction with the chiefdoms of the Catawba, Pee Dee, or Wateree drainages to the south (Eastman 1996)." It is suggested the term Yadkin be used for south of the James River and the term Levanna used north of the James River valley.

Hamilton arrowheads range from the south Allegheny Mountains and the south Appalachian Mountains to Florida. The concave base Hamilton with dates spanning 1600–1000 BP is also called Uwharrie in its central region. Along the upper Ohio Valley, a similar type to Hamilton has a subtle concave side with small Ears at the concave base, and apparently comes from the north Hocking River's Coshocton flint as surface finds, and the type occasionally seen at certain Feurt villages (Murphy 33Ms-2 abstract 1968:4, p. 1–14). A similarly described as Kelli Carmean writes in 2009, "Sharp (1988:195) has described basal projections, or "ears," a variation also present on some Broaddus specimens...In northeastern Kentucky, Type 2 points are diagnostic of the Early Fort Ancient (1000–1200 CE); elsewhere this type lasts longer, and marks Early and early Middle Fort Ancient (1000–1300 CE) times." A similar shape is found along the Guyandotte River area locally called an Altizer having no clear dates. These are varying triangle examples found on the surface.

Madison arrowheads have a more of a straight base and are dated 1100–200 BP. Originally named Mississippi Triangular Point in 1951, Edward G. Scully renamed it to the Madison point after further advanced research. Varying by time and region, Railey types 1 through 6 are trans-regional. Madison Railey types 4,5, and 6 appear with the semi-sedentary early fur trade hunters through the Ohio Valley. Later numbered types begin arriving in the state during the 16th century. These small triangles indicate in West Virginia the transitioning of Late Fort Ancient. Seasonal hunters' camps and seasonal towns quickly replace the sedentary farm culture period. Madison arrowheads range all over the Mississippi drainage and Gulf Coast through to along most of the Atlantic Coast. Both point types, elongated and the somewhat equal distant triangles of both dark flint and chert, are found on the surface across the state. The small Kanawha Black Flint Lavenna is predominate in central and northeast of the state.

=== Hunters and warriors ===
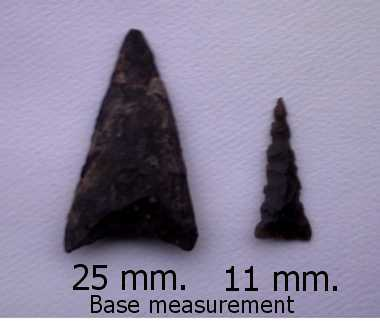
Piedmont region Yadkin. Example from the Blue Ridge Parkway North Carolina New River (800–400 BP).

As the changing weather system warmed the region, ushering in the Late Prehistoric agricultural period around 950 CE, scholars describe an enduring drought from roughly 800–900 CE, which deforested parts of Central America. According to some, this corresponds with the end of the Late Classic period of the Maya. Meanwhile, the Late Northeastern Woodland people, prior to the Woodland II period of the Virginia border region, were also experiencing milder weather as the northern Ohio Valley cereal, tuber, bean, and gourd field farmers introduce maize.

Weather conditions during 1350–1600 CE were better suited for maize growing on the upper Ohio Valley and West Virginia's tributary valleys. In the same time frame, the central and southwest Ohio (Till Plains) had cooler and wetter conditions, which affected the 'silking', pollination and grain filling stages that likely caused lower yields. Corn consumption decreased in the middle Ohio valley. The following weather pattern had intermittent droughts. This research also includes isotope analysis of samples from 47 archaeological sites in West and South Ohio, and western West Virginia (Staller, Tykot and Benz 2006:219,220). The scientists point out that samples from associated faunal remains would also be useful to obtain a clearer understanding. Donald and Greenlee, in 2005, hypothesised that a combination of ecological conditions and pre-existing agricultural technologies could also explain the regional people's diet.

Hamlet and crop farmers who trade with the Chesapeake Bay and the Gulf of Mexico coincide with the adaption of hunting bows in West Virginia. The early arrowhead called 'intrusive mound sniders point' wanes. In a broad sense, a Hamilton point type appears alongside other triangle types, while the dart is still in use. At some Feurt sites a needle-like elongated triangle point appear alongside large triangular points. A precursor to the Levanna is the large type, to the east of the state, found in areas of the early northerly Monongahelan and easterly Page pottery people. The Late Prehistoric people of West Virginia would see the triangles reduce in size to true Lavanna arrow points. The following fort building farmers arrive toward the middle 14th century and use early Madison types, smaller triangles. Atlatl, smaller lance points and small knives extend into this period among some of the peoples. Other stemmed "bird points" can occasionally be found, but, not as often as the archaic stemmed and notched atlatl dart's point.

River boating also becomes significant during the atlatl stone dart and stone arrow point arrival, with some evidence of a coastal trade. Some hunters and warriors transitioned to bow and arrow. Although, the atlatl and dart continued in use alongside the arrow into the Late Protohistoric. The main water way trade was the Ohio River tributaries to the Tennessee River system and the James and Potomac rivers to Chesapeake Bay. Although gigging from canoe is suspected, bow fishing is unknown. Eventually, not only localized tradesmen canoeing (Wakeman 2003:19). It is thought that forts were built as a defence against raids on these sedentary, agrarian, but productive people, who lived in their villages year round. Dr. McMichael explained that warfare can be assumed, as some corpses with projectile points in them were found at the last occurrence of a culturally uncommon large palisaded Fort Ancient village at the Buffalo Site, 46PU31. Along with other local smaller groups of Fort Ancients, 'Rolfe Lee 46Ms123 village period #2' is suspected to have returned to Buffalo's last occupation. Traditional historians, Atkinson, Lewis and others within the state, declare Buffalo village was destroyed as a result of Fur Trade encroachment. Since then, a shell tempered pipe (Fort Ancient) and part of an Iroquois pipe were found in one of the 46PU31 occupational period sites. Soon there follows the Late Clover phase and 'Orchard of mixed cultures' with much larger towns without palisaded walls. With advanced hunting tools in hand, and a changed focus, these people now seasonally break away from the town to winter camps up river tributaries to gather fur for trade. The last occupation at 'Rolfe Lee 46Ms123 period #1' is suspected to be one of these un-palisaded towns, during the dawn of local history.

Hunting parties left their towns after the growing season, moving up tributary streams to temporary camps through the winter in the state. Local legends suggest the hunt had a religious aspect.). The Riparian zone on the lower western drainage of the Allegheny Mountains has some creek bottoms which were covered over with shallow beaver lakes. At the base of these hills is the mantel created by watering animals at the edge of the beaver lake. The narrower bottom creeks become brooks flowing around cliff ridge-lines and rolling hills on enveloped terraces feeding the bottomland of major rivers. Along the bottom land and terrace of slower moving waters, the Late Prehistoric farming Indian had lived and canoed. Occasionally, an earlier hunter's point from antiquity can be found around these mantels, which are distant from today's dryer creek beds across plowable bottoms. With the exception of elk and mountain lion, absent today, these bowmen hunted today's game.

== Stone industry ==
Traditionally, archaeologists visually identify the geological origin of cherts using color and texture as the principal criteria. Officials and scientists from the Midwest to Missouri, Indiana, Alabama, Kentucky, Ohio, West Virginia, Pennsylvania, Tennessee and Virginia, working together in workshops, are now using Neutron Activation Analysis, Macroscopic, microscopic, and geochemical identification techniques to help identify regional cherts and chert sources.

It is legal to dig for "arrow heads" on one's own private property. However, for any suspected human bone find, one must stop digging and report the questionable bone to the county sheriff in West Virginia. This lawful department will notify the appropriate people for you. For hobbyist considerations, recorded details and location photos of the find increases value if not to the scientific community. The Council for West Virginia Archaeology (CWVA) and the West Virginia Archeology Society (WVAS) offer a list of resources to both formal school and 'club' educators. They promote the understanding of our prehistoric heritage. "Since ours is only part of a larger regional picture", CWVA and WVAS have selected some credible Internet resources. Their link can be found in the reference section below.

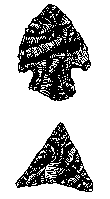
Jacks Reef and Levanna are true early state's arrow points.

Upper Ohio Valley Lithic Sources
(Mayer-Oakes, Carnegy Museum)

- Goose Creek outcrop
- Hughes River Flint
- Kanawha Flint
- Slade (aka Newman) Southwest to East in Kentucky

Bedrock chert along the both sides of the Upper Ohio Valley to the Big Sandy River's lower stream region is called:

- Brush Creek

Bedrock chert from counties surrounding Pittsburgh, Pennsylvania include:

- Loyalhanna
- Monongahela
- Uniontown
- Ten Mile

Stream cobble cherts of north eastern Ohio and westernmost Pennsylvania along Lake Erie (Alluvial cherts) include:

- Onondaga, secondary to Ohio Valley
- Gull River, secondary to Ohio Valley

Exotic to Upper Ohio Valley types include:

- Upper Mercer, counties of Coshocton, Ohio
- Flint Ridge (Vanport cherts) southeast of Upper Mercer
- Delaware chert Franklin County, Ohio area, common west of the Scioto River.

=== Stone walls and petroglyphs ===
Nearly every county has Petroglyphs—large stones decorated with Native American art. Most are on Homocline out-crops and boulders overlooking stream valleys, or are engraved on creek bed boulder sides and on top of some. Below the mouth of Paint creek there was a large "flat sided" stone embedded in the river, which the early settlers called the "picture rock" with many animals, and one person, engraved on it. Stone cutters used it for 19th century foundation construction. Another supposed stream-bed stone, twenty miles above Charleston, with a large fish engraving, had a similar fate as the "picture rock". Near the mouth of Campbell's creek a large stream-bed stone with Petroglyphs was cut for making a hearth. A portion of this "picture rock" still remains.

Many petroglyph boulders were quarried and removed for construction purposes in the state. In 1836, Alfred Beckley made a drawing and measured an enclosed stone wall with entrances, on Big Beaver Creek near Beckley at the town of Blue Jay, 46RG1. Large trees grew from the semi-enclosed walls, which was described as a "fort" wall or an early Spanish prospector's encampment. Beckley's report was published by Craig's "Olden Times" magazine which was in circulation from 1838 to 1840 at Pittsburgh. The Blue Jay Lumber Company was reported to have used the stone for an office building that still stands. There are also reports of Native American creating stone fishing weirs in creeks to facilitate gigging.

Below the mouth of Loup Creek, a salt spring was a noted buffalo lick. The remains of a stone wall, with gaps, runs along the overlooking ridgeline. Around these gaps great quantities of elk, deer, bear and other bones are still found today. Dr. Thomas S. Buster, who resided in Fayette County for around 50 years in the 19th century, wrote of the ancient wall lying immediately above Armstrong's Creek, Mount Carbon Stone Walls Site (46-Fa-1).

He describes it, near the Big Falls, about one hundred yards from the top of the mountain at Loup Creek, "When I first saw it, fifty-eight years ago, it was in a much better state of preservation than it now is. At that time a large portion of it was standing fully six or seven feet high, and was well built. Its thickness was about two feet at the base, and slightly tapered towards the top. There were a number of gates, or openings, in the wall, that are quite perceptible even at this time. They were, however, very plainly perceivable a half century ago. From the number of stones promiscuously scattered in the vicinity of the wall, my impression is that it was originally greater than seven or even eight feet in height." This wall was nearly three and a half miles long. Some have surmised it was nearly 10 miles long in total, having short branching elements also connected. Parts of these walls were damaged during the 20th century.

Immediately above the mouth of Paint creek on the Kanawha River, a similar stone wall was nearly five feet wide at some locations. This example was only about half a mile in length, but had higher walls nearly ten feet high.

A long-held theory proposes that watering and salt licking animals were driven to the wall's gaps, where waiting hunters had an advantage over the "herded" game. On bottom land near Mount Carbon, excavations in 1961–62 dated their finds back to about the 6th century CE and other finds to the 16th-century Fort Ancient occupation. The nearby Robson Mound was reported to have been a stone and earthen mound of about fifty five feet in height, before fortune hunters reduced it to a couple of feet, long before modern science arrived. The nearby Dempsey Mound in Fayette County, along Laurel Creek, was also reduced before modern science arrived. Beards Fork Petroglyphs are a few miles away. The site at Alloy in Fayette County, 46FA189, is a Woodland occupation site.

From the state's Native American tradition, an interpretation of these sites is suggested: the watershed springs, near flint outcrops with archaeological sites, are interpreted as having spiritual significance—being portals to other spiritual dimensions such as the underworld. The outcrops are interpreted as the place of the "Flint Spirit." The spirits of Native American travelers on the river, and the spirit of the river, also held a religious significance. For stone walls and rock piles or cairns near archaeological sites, "the evidence begins to suggest these sites are part of a regional phenomenon". The locations include: Paint Creek Stone Wall, Rush Creek Wall, Raleigh County WV Wall Site (unverified), Omar, Logan County, WV (unverified), and other stone cairns throughout the Kanawha Region.

== Ceramic industry ==
Bowls of steatite, such as those found as Burning Spring Branch Site (46KA142), were gradually replaced by sandstone, which were eventually replaced by ceramic bowls. Ceramics were introduced to Fayette Thick ceramics at Coco Station (46Ka294); preliminary examination suggests the deposits date primarily from 1200 to 800/700 BCE.

The earliest ceramics of the region's Woodland Culture is called the Half-Moon Ware. Studies at Winfield Locks Site (46PU4) suggest that the Half-Moon Cordmarked variant is a new provisional Early Woodland (1500–400 BC) ceramic series (Niquette and all). Jonathan P. Kerr writes, "Traditionally, archeologists distinguish the Woodland period from the preceding Archaic by the appearance of cord-marked or fabric-marked pottery, the construction of burial mounds and other earthworks and the rudimentary practice of agriculture (Willey 1966:267)."

Johnson Plain and Levissa Cordmarked are Early Middle Woodland ware from the Adena Phase of the Scioto Tradition in Ohio. These are similar to Peters ceramics and considered to be ancestors of the Middle Woodland wares of the Scioto Tradition from certain Ohio Adena sites. Two variants of the Adena ceramics in the Ohio Valley are the Fayette Thick and Adena Plain.

Watson pottery appears during the end of the Middle Woodland period, 100–800 CE. Exterior surface finishes, towards the eastern area, are either cord-marked or plain, and are rarely incised. It is often more a smoothed surface. This type of ceramic post-dates Classic Adena occupations on the upper Ohio River Valley. Watson immediately precedes the Page ceramic components in West Virginia. Watson ceramics are also found on the upper reaches of the Potomac River Valley in westernmost Maryland, West Virginia, ranging to eastern Ohio and western Pennsylvania, also over a large area in the upper Ohio River Valley.

Mahoning Plain and Cordmarked Pottery type description includes three main types that date to the Middle-Late Woodland: Mahoning cordmarked, Mahoning plain, and Mahoning incised. A coil method, using crushed igneous rock (e.g., granite) or quartz) temper are called Monongahela cordmarked and Mahoning incised. Mahoning incised is more common in the Ohio Valley. Mahoning cordmarked decoration was crafted on the lip area. It may also be notched or impressed. A few sherds have shown evidence of fabric impressions. The rim is slightly flared and sometimes found folded. Decoration is confined along the rim to the necks. Mahoning ware "seems to occur on sites which are Middle Woodland or Hopewellian".

Armstrong (1–500 CE) has leading characteristics of being thin and tempered with particles of clay similar in color to the Peters ceramics, an oxidized color. They can have semi-pointed or flat bottoms and are generally large; see Peters Cordmarked and Peters Plain.

Buck Garden (500–1200 CE) is crushed rock (of flint or sandstone) tempered, cord marked and with occasional paddle edge decorations. It is similar to Armstrong with less variation in shape and size.

Page pottery dates from 900 to 1450 CE in the western Piedmont Plateau region and west through the Great Valley, Ridge and Valley, and Appalachian Plateau regions of Maryland, Virginia, West Virginia, and Pennsylvania. Page Cord-marked ware has limestone-temper material.

Somerset phase ceramics are similar to Page ceramics of the upper Potomac River Valley. Somerset ceramics Type Site is based on the Pennsylvania Keyser Farm site (44PA1). Maryland sites with Page components include Nolands Ferry (18FR17)*, Mason Island (18MO13)*, Cresaptown (18AG119), Barton (18AG3), Sang Run (918GA22)*, Friendsville (18GA23)* (* collections at MAC Lab). The Page Cordmarked Rims center of distribution is in the Huffman Phase on the James River drainage of the western slopes of the Blue Ridge Mountains, otherwise, from the eastern slopes of the Allegheny Mountains through central Virginia.

Drew pottery (900~1350 CE) has a high percentage of plain ware and some with unique neck decorations. The latter has "parallel trailed elements as well as multiple motifs of lip appendages," according to Richard George. This pottery's characteristics are slightly rounded bottoms rather than the tear-drop shape. The late Dr. Richard L. George, Society for Pennsylvania Archaeology, likens this pottery shape to a "bean pot." Drew is an earlier phase of the Monongahelan of northern West Virginia and south western Pennsylvania. As suggested earlier by George, ongoing research projects evidence of Drew is increasingly seen as a separate culture (Johnson & Speedy 2009).

Monongahela Cordmarked, Plain, and Incised pottery is found to be tempered with crushed shell. They used a coiling technique with malleation (tapping) by paddle and anvil. A cord-wrapped paddle was made to create the Cordmarkings. Interiors are smoothed and are plain or cordmarked with some smoothing. Decorations are found near the lip and adjacent lower rim. Monongahela Incised has the addition of incised parallel or rectilinear lines. The Worley village Complex (46Mg23) dates to about 900 CE (WVAS). Monongahela ceramics begin with an early grit or limestone tempered group.

Feurt-incised pottery (beginning around 1100 CE) of the Fort Ancient Tradition appears along today's Ohio and West Virginia state bordering shores using shell tempering with its decorated incised oblique lines. It ranges from the lower Scioto and Guyandotte rivers and upstream to the lower Muskingum and Little Kanawha rivers area, central to the greater area of the 'Mouth of the Great Kanawha River'. James L. Murphy in 1968 reports, "The strap handles recovered from the site (Hobson Feurt site) certainly do not resemble Madisonville or "Clover Complex" material. Nor does the material strongly resemble Monongahela wares." Gartley, Carskadden, and Morton in 1976 reported, "The presence of lug handles rather than straps and the paucity of decorative motifs other than punctates distinguish Philo Punctate (A.D. 1230-A.D. 1260) from later Feurt ceramics in the Muskingum valley."

Cordage Twist impressed pottery decoration is found at Monongahelan and Fort Ancient sites of both shell tempered pottery and some limestone tempered. Middle and Late Woodland cordage twist in the state is among several more other earlier pottery finish types and more north-westerly S-twist cordage. Higher amounts of Z-twist are found at 7 sites in the west central of the state, or about half the later amount. By the Late Prehistoric and Protohistoric, the Z-Twist shows more predominantly on the Peterson map 5.1 in the southern half West Virginia—14 sites with 70–100% and the remaining 0–30% S-Twist Cordage. Gnagey village (southwest Pennsylvania, 36SO55 1000–1100 CE Monongahela, limestone) has 98% z-Twist (196 items) and 2% s-Twist (4 items). At the mouth of the Great Kanawha, the Lewis Farm site (46Ms57, 1300 CE, Feurt, shell) was excavated and had only Z-twist Cordage. These Z- and S-twist cordage methods date from 1000~1640 CE, ending with Rolfe Lee #1, 46Ms51 Clover, shell 87.7 Z-twist, 7% S-Twist (remainder not in-situ) and Rolfe Lee #2 46Ms123 Clover, shell 92% Z-Twist and 8% S-Twist (Maslowski 1984b).

The direction of the cord spin twist wrapped on the paddle is either S, left to right, or Z, right to left. The type appears in E Virginia earlier (a mix of twist pre-200 CE), and through to Vermont after the end of the Middle Woodland period about CE 800. During the Sponemann phase (750–800 CE), Sponemann Site is the type site for non-American Bottom migrants making a high amount of Z-Twist pottery using chert for temper. These non-residents are a significant influx into the area with the first significant evidence for maize before the occurrence of the cities of Cahokia people. The other dominant phase in the region of the Ohio and Mississippi rivers confluence is the Patrick Phase. These people existed from 1350 to 1150 BP. Like Sponemann people, they were more complex than bands, but, less complex than chiefdoms and the indicators are not present that would show a ranking and stratification society). Patrick Phase pottery is marked predominantly with S-twist cordage.

Corncob-Impressed Pottery at Late Prehistoric Sites in West Virginia Because of recent field research results, quoting "A significant percentage of the assemblage (Recent excavations at Burning Spring Branch 46Ka142) exhibited corncob impressing similar to that found in southwestern Virginia. A study of pottery from other sites in West Virginia determined that the use of this previously unrecognized surface treatment was extensive. This discovery adds weight to the argument that Siouan groups migrated through West Virginia and may have inhabited the Kanawha Valley. It also suggests that further research is needed to determine associations between the precontact inhabitants of the Kanawha Valley and those in southwestern Virginia and the Ohio Valley."

There are no clearly Classic Mississippian culture pottery found in West Virginia. The nearest pure Mississippian archeological site is located near Evansville, Indiana, just below the Louisville Falls, according to several regional societies, particularly referencing the Ohio Historical Society observations. These refined definitions are based on the latest modern tools and field science within the region, which tends to make obsolete the publications of earlier decades, based on older work from neighboring regions. Within the greater Mississippi Culture, the Plaquemine culture used shell for tempering on their round vessels with some having narrow necks that were engraved after firing as early as 700 CE.

A very early Fort Ancient village on the Ohio River at Wood County (46WD1) has been dated to 891 CE and again to 973 CE (Graybill 1987). The Feurt ceramics and neighboring Baum ceramics adjoining Baldwin phases, and nearby Monongahelan ceramics, are contemporaneous with the easterly Page pottery people of the border region of the Virginias from the divide of the Alleghenian mountains. The Watson ceramics period precedes all of these in the upper Ohio Valley and in the Potomac Highlands.

=== Mid-Atlantic ceramics list ===
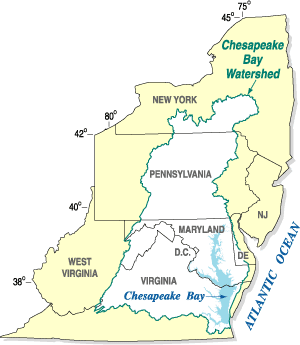
The Chesapeake Bay Watershed

A partial list of Mid-Atlantic States ceramics follows:

- Accokeek pottery dates from 900 BCE–300 BCE throughout the Coastal Plain of Maryland and into Virginia to the James River. (Type Site Accokeek Creek, 18PR8)
- Clemson Island pottery dates from 800 to 1400 CE in Great Valley (upper Potomac River tributaries), Ridge and Valley regions of Maryland, central Pennsylvania, Eastern Panhandle of West Virginia and north-western Virginia.
- Keyser is shell-tempered Cord-marked pottery which dates from 1400 to 1550 CE throughout the Piedmont, Great Valley, and Ridge and Valley regions of Maryland, Virginia, West Virginia, and Pennsylvania. (Type Site, Clemson Island)
- Marcey Creek pottery dates from 1000 to 750 BCE; 1200–800 BCE throughout the Coastal Plain and Piedmont Regions, from Delaware south to the James River in Virginia. (Type Site, Marcey Creek site)
- Schultz pottery dating to 1600 CE has incised decoration, usually in triangular or diamond shaped patterns. These are found in western Maryland, south western Pennsylvania, the Potomac Highlands of West Virginia and north western Virginia. Kent examined detailed ceramic descriptions of the pre-Contact Susquehannock sequence.
- Selden Island pottery dates from 1000 to 750 BCE from Virginia to Delaware and southeastern Pennsylvania, throughout the Maryland Coastal Plain and Piedmont. (Type Site, Selden Island 18MO20)
- Shepard pottery dates from 900 to 1450 CE throughout the Piedmont and Great Valley regions of Maryland, and also rarely in the western Coastal Plain (Chesapeake Bay). (Type Site, Shepard Site 18MO3, Maryland sites with Shephard components Biggs Ford (18FR14)*, Devilbiss (18FR38)*, Rosenstock (18FR18)*, Shepard (18MO3), Hughes (18MO1)*, Winslow (18MO9) *collections at the MAC Lab.)
- Townsend ceramics found on the Shores of Maryland and the Eastern Shores of Virginia of the Late Woodland, Slaighter Creek Complex. Blaker, in 1963, defined this Delmarva Peninsula pottery as shell tempered, fabric impressed, conoidal with various incised and corded motifs Townsend wares date from 950 to 1600 CE. (MAC)
- Vinette pottery dates from 600 BCE–200 CE on the east coast from New England to Maryland and west to central New York and the Ottawa valley of eastern Ontario, primarily in rockshelters and in surface collections in Maryland. (Type Site, Vinette Site, northeast of Finger Lakes, New York). Maryland sites with Vinette components are the Chickadee Rock Shelter (18WA13), Bushey's Cavern (18WA18); the Barton Complex (18AG3, 18AG8) nor radiocarbon dates in Maryland.

== Some of the more studied sites ==
- Childers, 46MS121
- Watson, 46HK34
- Fairchance, 46MR13
- Jenkins House Site, 46CB41
- Niebert, 46MS103
- Woods, 46MS14
- Cash Farm, 46PPU79
- Weed Shelter, 46CB56
- Alloy, 46FA189
- Jarvis Farm, 46KA105
- Reed, 46KA166
- Big Run, 46WD53
- Muskingum Island, 46WD61
- Parkline Site, 46PU99
- Buck Garden, 46NI49 (with multi-level component)
- Morrison Shelter, 46NI8 (with multi-level component)
- Green Sulphur,46SU67/72
- Winfield Locks Site, 46PU4

== See also ==
- History of West Virginia
- Protohistory of West Virginia
- Monetons
- West Virginia waterways
