= Blackrock Springs Site =

Archaeological site in Virginia, United States

- U.S. National Register of Historic Places
- Virginia Landmarks Register
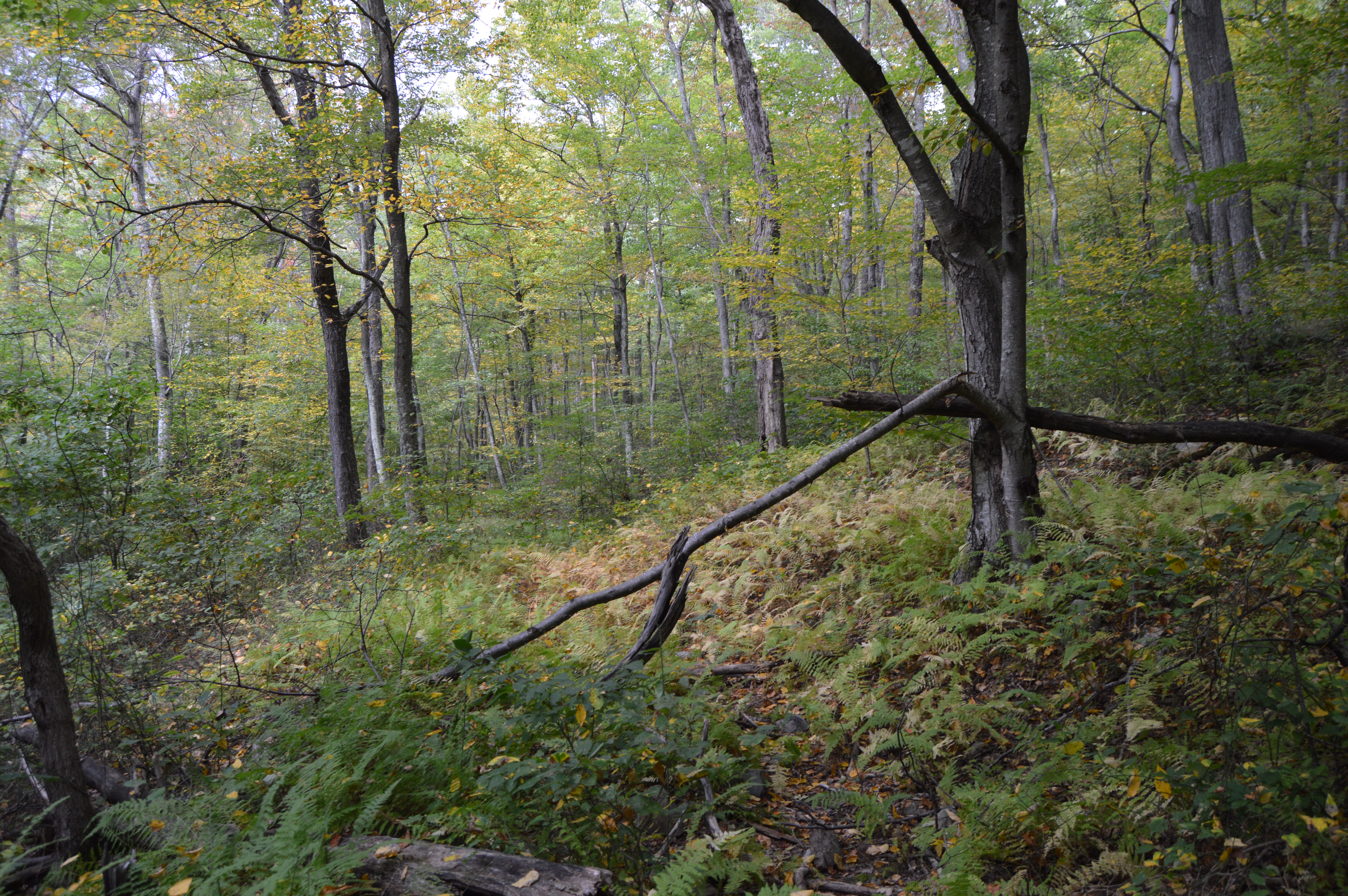
- Overview, with the spring in the foreground

- Location within Virginia Location within the United States
- Location: Eastern side of the Blue Ridge at the source of Paine Run, Grottoes, Virginia
- Coordinates: 38°12′30″N 78°45′9″W
- Area: 0.4 acres (0.16 ha)
- NRHP reference No.: 85003169
- VLR No.: 007-1149

Significant dates
- Added to NRHP: December 13, 1985
- Designated VLR: September 16, 1982

The Blackrock Springs Site (44-AU-167) is an archaeological site in Shenandoah National Park, in Augusta County, Virginia, United States.

The site was discovered during the early 1970s as part of a comprehensive survey of the national park. It is one of fifteen sites that the survey found along Paine Run, a group that also includes the Paine Run Rockshelter and the unnamed 44-AU-154. Located near the stream's source at Blackrock Springs, the site measures approximately 150 by 60 metres (490 ft × 200 ft), although the survey concluded that it was only about 5 centimetres (2.0 in) deep. It was occupied during an exceptionally long period of time, beginning before 7000 BC and continuing until after 1000 BC; among the earliest artifacts found at Blackrock Springs is a St. Albans-related projectile point, and the most intensive uses appear to date from the middle to late Archaic period. This chronological distribution, together with the uneven physical distribution of artifacts (most were found in several small clusters, rather than being spread evenly around the site) and the nature of the artifacts found (approximately 98% of the three thousand items catalogued were pieces of locally obtained quartzite), led investigators to conclude that millennia of tribesmen in the Shenandoah Valley and the Piedmont used the site as a base camp for occasional hunting and gathering on the mountainside.

The Blackrock Springs Site's archaeological value is so significant that it was listed on the National Register of Historic Places in December 1985, together with the Paine Run shelter and site 44-AU-154.
