= Archeological Site No. AU-154 =

Archaeological site in Virginia, United States

- U.S. National Register of Historic Places
- Virginia Landmarks Register
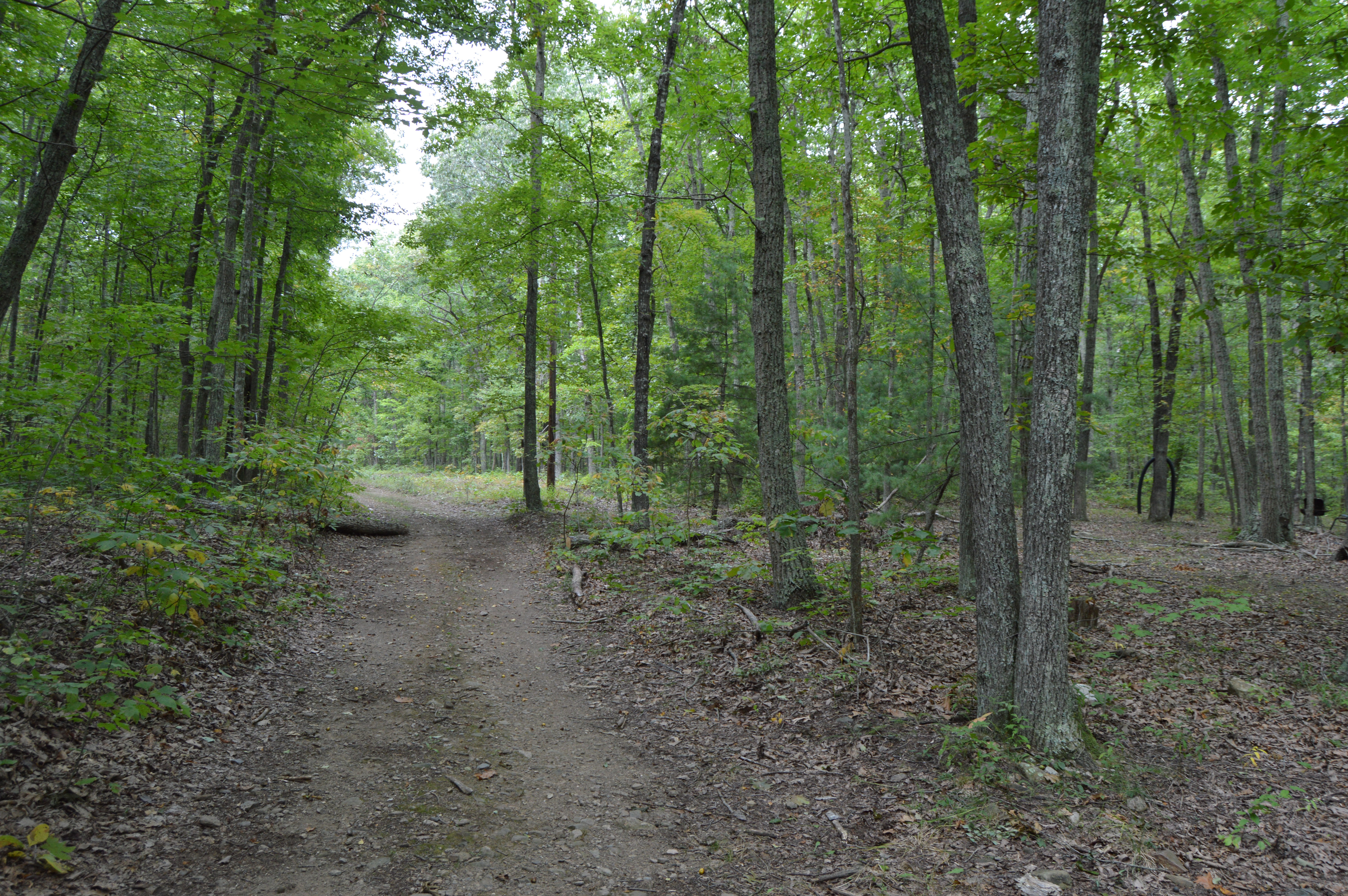
- Scene along the road

- Location within Virginia Location within the United States
- Location: Paine Run Hollow Road at the mouth of Paine Run Hollow, Grottoes, Virginia
- Coordinates: 38°11′56″N 78°47′44″W
- Area: 0.3 acres (0.12 ha)
- NRHP reference No.: 85003171
- VLR No.: 007-1148

Significant dates
- Added to NRHP: December 13, 1985
- Designated VLR: September 16, 1982

Site AU-154 (in full, 44-AU-154) is an archaeological site in Shenandoah National Park, in Augusta County, Virginia, United States.

The site was discovered during the early 1970s as part of a comprehensive survey of the national park. It is one of fifteen sites that the survey found along Paine Run, a group that also includes the Paine Run Rockshelter and the Blackrock Springs Site.

Site 44-AU-154 lies on the southern side of Paine Run at the mouth of its hollow, on the edge of the national park and at the foot of the Blue Ridge, thus occupying a transition zone between the Shenandoah Valley and the mountain. It extends from the stream to the base of the mountain, approximately 25 metres (82 ft) north to south, while east to west it is four times as long. At the time of its discovery, a Forest Service fire road bisected the site; the northern half was partially occupied by a privately owned house, while the southern half was part of the national park. Approximately 400 metres (1,300 ft) east of the site is a rock outcrop with several rockshelters, including the significant Paine Run Rockshelter.

Out of more than 2,000 artifacts discovered in a cursory excavation of the road and roadside sections of the site, more than 98% were locally obtainable jasper and quartzite. Some of the projectile points found at the site were characteristic of the Savannah River and Halifax cultures, allowing the site's occupation to be dated as occurring between 3000 and 1000 BC. During this time, the site is likely to have been used as a semipermanent base camp for Indians relying either on the mountain resources or the resources of the valley, whether for tool-manufacturing, processing hunted animals, or using plants found nearby. Because AU-154 bears evidence of a wider range of activities than do some of the smaller sites located higher up on Paine Run, it may have been a central point for activities occurring at the single-use higher camps.

The site's archaeological value is so significant that it was listed on the National Register of Historic Places in December 1985, together with the Paine Run shelter and the Blackrock Springs Site.
