= Grave Creek Mound =

- U.S. National Register of Historic Places
- U.S. National Historic Landmark
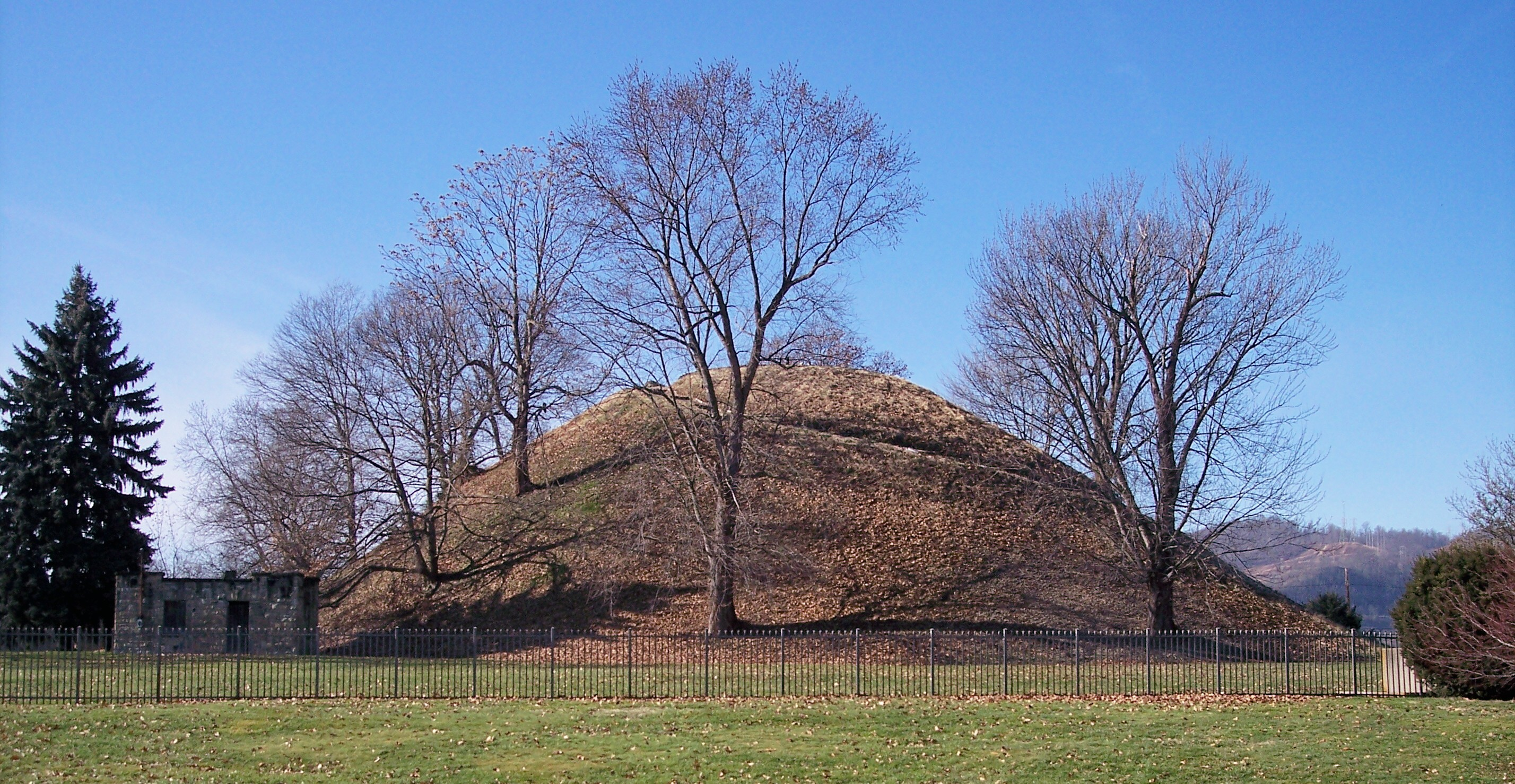
- Grave Creek Mound in 2006
- Location: Tomlinson and 9th Streets, Moundsville, West Virginia
- Coordinates: 39°55′00.86″N 80°44′40.49″W
- Built: 250–150 BC
- NRHP reference No.: 66000751

Significant dates
- Added to NRHP: October 15, 1966
- Designated NHL: July 19, 1964

The Grave Creek Mound in the Ohio River Valley in West Virginia is one of the largest conical-type burial mounds in the United States, now standing 62 feet (19 m) high and 240 feet (73 m) in diameter. The builders of the site, members of the Adena culture, moved more than 60,000 tons of dirt to create it about 250–150 BC.

Present-day Moundsville has developed around it near the banks of the Ohio River. The first recorded excavation of the mound took place in 1838, and was conducted by local amateurs Abelard Tomlinson and Thomas Biggs. The largest surviving mound among those built by the Adena, this was designated a National Historic Landmark in the mid-20th century.

In 1978 the state opened the Delf Norona Museum at the site. It displays numerous artifacts and interprets the ancient Adena Culture. In 2010, under an agreement with the state, the US Army Corps of Engineers gave nearly 450,000 artifacts to the museum for archival storage. These were recovered in archeological excavations at the site of the Marmet Lock, and represent 10,000 years of indigenous habitation in the area.

== Description ==
Grave Creek Mound is the largest conical type of any of the mound builder structures. Construction of the earthwork mound took place in successive stages from about 250–150 B.C., as indicated by the multiple burials at different levels within the structures. In 1838, road engineers measured its height at 69 feet (21 m) and its base as 292 feet (89 m).

Originally a moat of about 40 feet (12 m) in width and five feet (1.5 m) in depth, with one causeway across it, encircled the mound for defensive purposes. Inside the mound, archaeological researchers have discovered Adena remains and ornaments. In addition, they discovered a small sandstone tablet, the Grave Creek Stone, which modern scholars believe to be a hoax.

== History ==
=== Pre-history ===
Grave Creek mound was created during the Woodland time period (late Adena Period around 1000 BC to about 1 AD). The people who lived in West Virginia during this time are among those groups classified as Mound Builders. This particular tumulus or burial mound was built in successive stages over a period of a hundred years.

=== 18th century ===
The Grave Creek Mound was believed first seen by a European American in 1770, when Joseph Tomlinson and his brother built a log cabin at Grave Creek Flats. Joseph discovered the mound accidentally while hunting. Two years later, he built a cabin for his family 300 feet (91 m) from the mound. It was visited in 1775 by the young Englishman Nicholas Cresswell on his canoe expedition down the Ohio River. He describes the mound, its history and surrounding structures in his journal (p. 71). In 1803, Merriwether Lewis wrote about the mound in his journal; he saw it on his way to meet William Clark in Louisville, Kentucky on their expedition to explore the Louisiana Purchase.

=== 19th century ===
On March 19, 1838, the landowner Jesse Tomlinson's nephew, Abelard Tomlinson, and Abelard's brother-in-law Thomas Biggs began excavation on the first of three shafts into Grave Creek Mound. The first shaft was begun approximately 4 feet (1.2 m) up on the north face of the mound, likely so that the excavated soil could be deposited in the ditch rather than be carted away. At approximately 111 feet (34 m) into the mound a burial chamber was discovered, dug into the original ground surface. The burial chamber was reported to have been a cuboid measuring 8 feet (2.4 m) by 12 feet (3.7 m) aligned north-south and dug 7–8 ft into the natural ground surface. While contemporary reports indicate that the lower burial was central to the mound, given the 295 feet (90 m) diameter of the mound recorded in 1838, and the 111 feet (34 m) tunnel, this may have been a simplification, with the burial merely "central", rather than in the exact center. The lower tomb contained two burials, one on the eastern side and the other on the western. The western was found with approximately 650 beads of either shell or ivory depending on the historical accounting (either the local doctor, Dr. James Clemens, or the ethnologist Henry Schoolcraft). The second two tunnels were dug following the discovery of the lower vault, one vertical from the top into the mound and the second approximately halfway up on the northern face. These two shafts intersected at a second burial chamber, containing a single burial, discovered June 9, 1838. Among the artifacts reported were 1700 ivory beads, 500 sea shells, and five copper bracelets. The tunnels they made destroyed valuable evidence that could have been used by researchers to compare with data from other mounds. Once the mound was completely excavated, Tomlinson expanded the lower burial chamber and opened a museum inside the mound, charging an admission fee for visitors though it was later abandoned in 1847. In 1843, Henry Rowe Schoolcraft, an early ethnologist of Native Americans, mapped the area. He later was appointed as the US Indian Agent along the northern frontier and based in Michigan.

=== 20th century ===
In 1908 the mound was saved from demolition for development by local women of the Wheeling Chapter of the Daughters of the American Revolution, who raised funds to acquire an option on the property. In 1909 the state of West Virginia purchased the site for preservation. It was declared a National Historic Landmark in 1964.

Further archaeological investigation led to the discovery that the appearance of the earth of the mound is quite different underneath the surface compared to the land around it. Although it was built of the same dirt, the remains of dead bodies that were burned changed the color of some dirt to blue.

== Delf Norona Museum ==
The Delf Norona Museum, which is named for the archaeologist Delf Norona, displays many artifacts found at the site. It is owned and operated by the West Virginia Division of Culture and History. Opened in 1978, the museum has exhibits that interpret the culture of the Adena people and theories about how the mound was constructed.

In the 21st century, the U.S. Army Corps of Engineers transferred nearly 450,000 artifacts to the Delf Norona Museum for curation and archival. They were recovered during the 1990s in an extended archeological excavation for the replacement site of the Marmet Lock on the Kanawha River. The artifacts, representing 10,000 years of habitation by varying cultures at one site in the Kanawha Valley, include stone projectile knives, a 3,000-year-old sandstone cooking bowl hand carved before the people started making pottery, and stone jewelry from a Fort Ancient village.

In April 2010, the state mounted two exhibits of artifacts from the site at the rotunda of the state capitol in Charleston. The exhibits included historic items dating from the John Reynolds plantation, including pendants made by slaves from 1790s Spanish coins, and material related to colonial salt production. The major part of the exhibit is made up of prehistoric artifacts of Native American peoples, whose occupation of the valley continued for thousands of years, much longer than the brief settlement of European Americans. Additional exhibits will be mounted as the state's Office of Culture and History has an opportunity to assess the artifacts. The Native American artifacts will be kept at the Delf Norona Museum.

== See also ==
- Criel Mound
- Grave Creek Stone
- List of U.S. National Historic Landmarks by state
- National Register of Historic Places listings in West Virginia
- List of burial mounds in the United States
- Prehistory of West Virginia
