= Delf Norona =

- Born: April 14, 1895
- Died: April 12, 1974 (aged 78)
- Engineering career
- Institutions: Ohio Valley Stamp Club; American Philatelic Congress
- Projects: student of postal history of the United States and an expert on postal history of West Virginia
- Awards: APS Hall of Fame

Delf Norona (April 14, 1895 – April 12, 1974) of West Virginia, was an archaeologist, historian, and student of philately who wrote on subjects of Mound Builders, in particular the Grave Creek Mound of West Virginia, and postal history, including postal history of the state of West Virginia.

== Early life ==
Norona was born in Hong Kong as a British subject, but spent much of his early life in the Philippines. As a young man he immigrated first to Canada, and then in 1921 to West Virginia. in the United States where he became a court reporter after teaching himself shorthand. Norona's son, Delf A. Norona, was born in 1922 in West Virginia. Norona became a naturalized citizen of the U.S. in 1927. While the West Virginia Encyclopedia indicates Norona served in the U.S. Army during World War I, Norona reported he was not a veteran in the 1930 US census.

== Archaeological career ==
Norona is best known for his study of the Grave Creek Mound in Moundsville, West Virginia, of which he wrote the definitive history. Norona was instrumental in the creation of the Mound Museum in 1952. He was the museum's curator from its founding until his death in 1974. The modern museum built in the late 1970s at Grave Creek Mound opened in 1978 and is named in Norona's honor

In 1949 Norona and others founded the West Virginia Archaeological Society. He wrote numerous articles which appeared in the journals West Virginia History and West Virginia Archeologist and served as editor of the West Virginia Archeologist.

== Philatelic activity ==
Norona was very active in stamp collecting in the Ohio Valley area of West Virginia, founding the Ohio Valley Stamp Club in Wheeling, West Virginia, in 1935. He was a student of postal history of the United States and especially West Virginia. Because of his interest in West Virginia postal history, he worked with West Virginia historical societies, such as the West Virginia Historical Society, the West Virginia Archeological Society, and the West Virginia Civil War Centennial Commission.

== Philatelic literature ==
At the American Philatelic Congress Norona presented his paper Preparation of Technical Philatelic Articles at the first meeting of the society in December 1935. In 1933 he edited the first volume of Cyclopedia of United States Postmarks and Postal History, and in 1935 he edited the second volume of the series. Norona wrote numerous articles on various aspects of United States postal history, and, in 1935, he published his General Catalogue of United States Postmarks.

== Honors and awards ==
Norona was named to the American Philatelic Society Hall of Fame in 1975. Norona was awarded the inaugural Sigfus Olafson Award by the West Virginia Archaeological Society for his outstanding contributions to West Virginia archeology.

== Archives and papers ==
Some of Norona's correspondence is held by the West Virginia and Regional History Center, West Virginia University Libraries, Morgantown, West Virginia.

== See also ==
- Philately
- Philatelic literature
