= Criel Mound =

- South Charleston Mound
- U.S. National Register of Historic Places
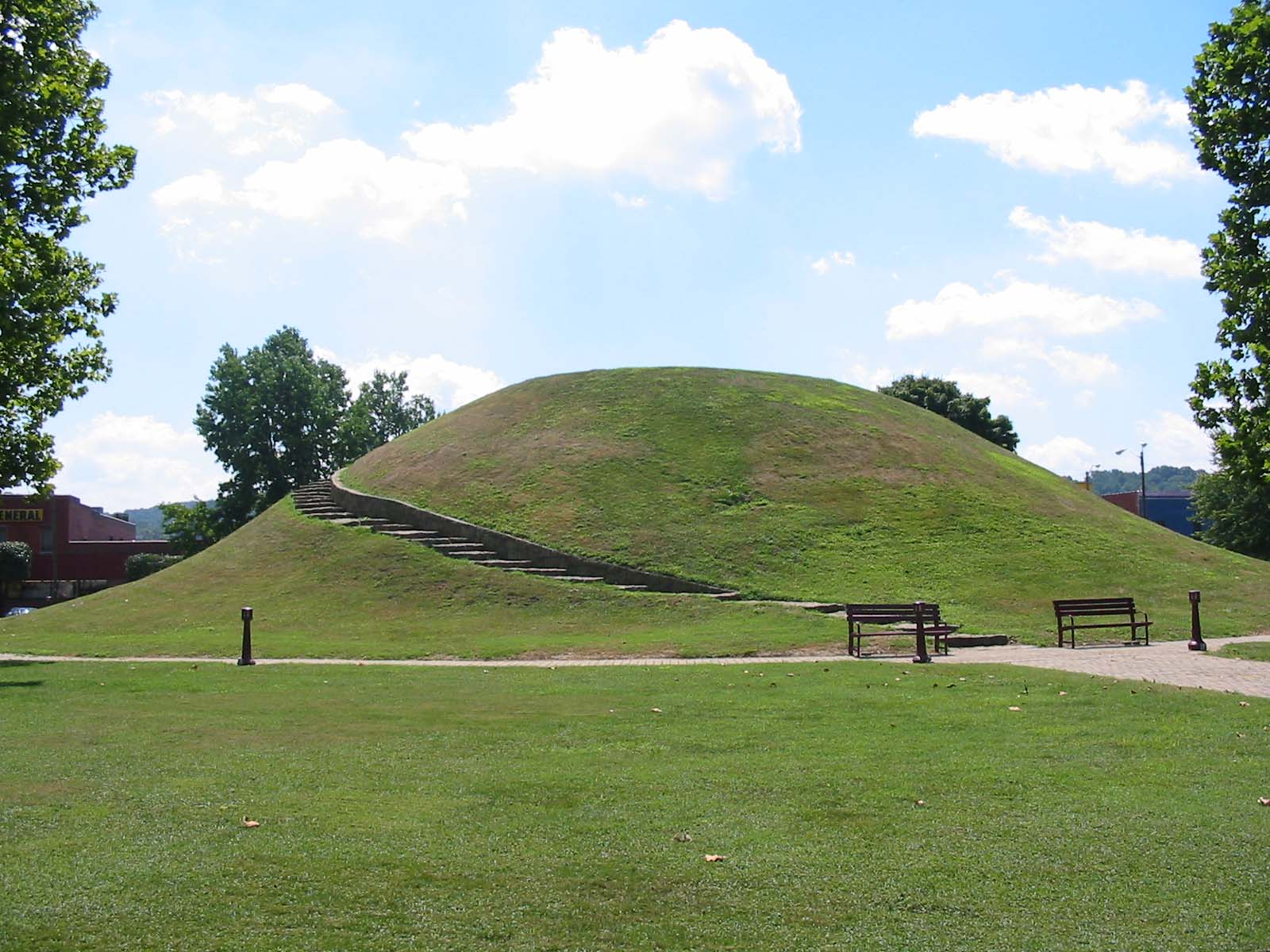
- The Criel Mound

- Location within West Virginia Location within the United States
- Location: US 60 (MacCorkle Avenue), in city park, South Charleston, West Virginia
- Coordinates: 38°22′7″N 81°41′48″W
- Area: 1.5 acres (0.61 ha)
- NRHP reference No.: 70000655
- Added to NRHP: October 15, 1970

The Criel Mound, also known as the South Charleston Mound, is a Native American burial mound located in South Charleston, West Virginia. It is one of the few surviving mounds of the Kanawha Valley Mounds that were probably built in the Woodland period after 500 B.C. The mound was built by the Adena culture, probably around 250–150 BC, and lay equidistant between two “sacred circles”, earthwork enclosures each 556 feet (169 m) in diameter. It was originally 33 feet (10 m) high and 173 feet (53 m) in diameter at the base, making it the second-largest such burial mound in the state of West Virginia. (The Grave Creek Mound in Moundsville is the largest.) This archaeological site is listed on the National Register of Historic Places.

== History ==
The mound was originally conical in shape. Residents of the area leveled the top in 1840 to erect a judges' stand, as they ran horse races around the base of the mound at the time.

The Criel Mound was excavated in 1883–84 under the auspices of the US Bureau of Ethnology and the supervision of Col. P.W. Norris. The excavation was performed by Professor Cyrus Thomas of the Smithsonian Institution. Inside the mound, Professor Thomas found thirteen skeletons: two near the top of the mound, and eleven at the base. The skeletons at the base consisted of a single very large but badly decayed skeleton at the center, a "once most powerful man" which according to A.R. Sines, who assisted Col. Norris in the excavation, measured "Six feet, 8 3/4 inches" (205 cm) from head to heel (the Smithsonian nomination form added "but the extreme height indicated might have been an exaggeration created by earth pressing down on the burial"). This skeleton was surrounded by ten other skeletons arranged in a spoke-like pattern, with their feet pointing toward the central skeleton. The skeletons at the base had been wrapped in elm bark and were lying on a floor of white ash and bark. Several artifacts were found buried with the skeletons, including arrowheads, lanceheads, and shell and pottery fragments. The central skeleton was accompanied by a fish-dart, a lance-head, and a sheet of hammered native copper near the head. Holes found at the base of the mound suggest that the bodies at the base had been enclosed in a wooden vault.

=== Kanawha Valley Mounds ===
The Criel Mound is part of the second-largest known concentration of Adena mounds and circular enclosures which Cyrus Thomas called the "Kanawha Valley Mounds". This area extends for eight miles (13 km) along the upper terraces of the Kanawha River floodplain, in the vicinity of present-day Charleston. In 1894, Cyrus Thomas reported 50 mounds in this area, ranging from 3’ to 35’ in height and from 35’ to 200’ in diameter. He also reported finding eight to ten circular earthworks, enclosing from 1 to 30 acres (120,000 m^{2}). Stone mounds dotted the bluffs above the floodplain.

While many of the original Adena mounds were destroyed during later development of the area, a few remain. The Wilson Mound is in a private cemetery in South Charleston. A recreation of the original Shawnee Reservation Mound exists in Institute, West Virginia.

=== Staunton Park ===
Today, the Criel Mound is the centerpiece of Staunton Park, a small municipal park maintained by the city of South Charleston. It is a gathering place for community activities, such as arts and crafts fairs, revivals, memorial services, sunrise services, and town carnivals.

== See also ==
- Adena culture
- Mound builders
- Prehistory of West Virginia
- South Charleston, West Virginia
