= Levanna projectile point =

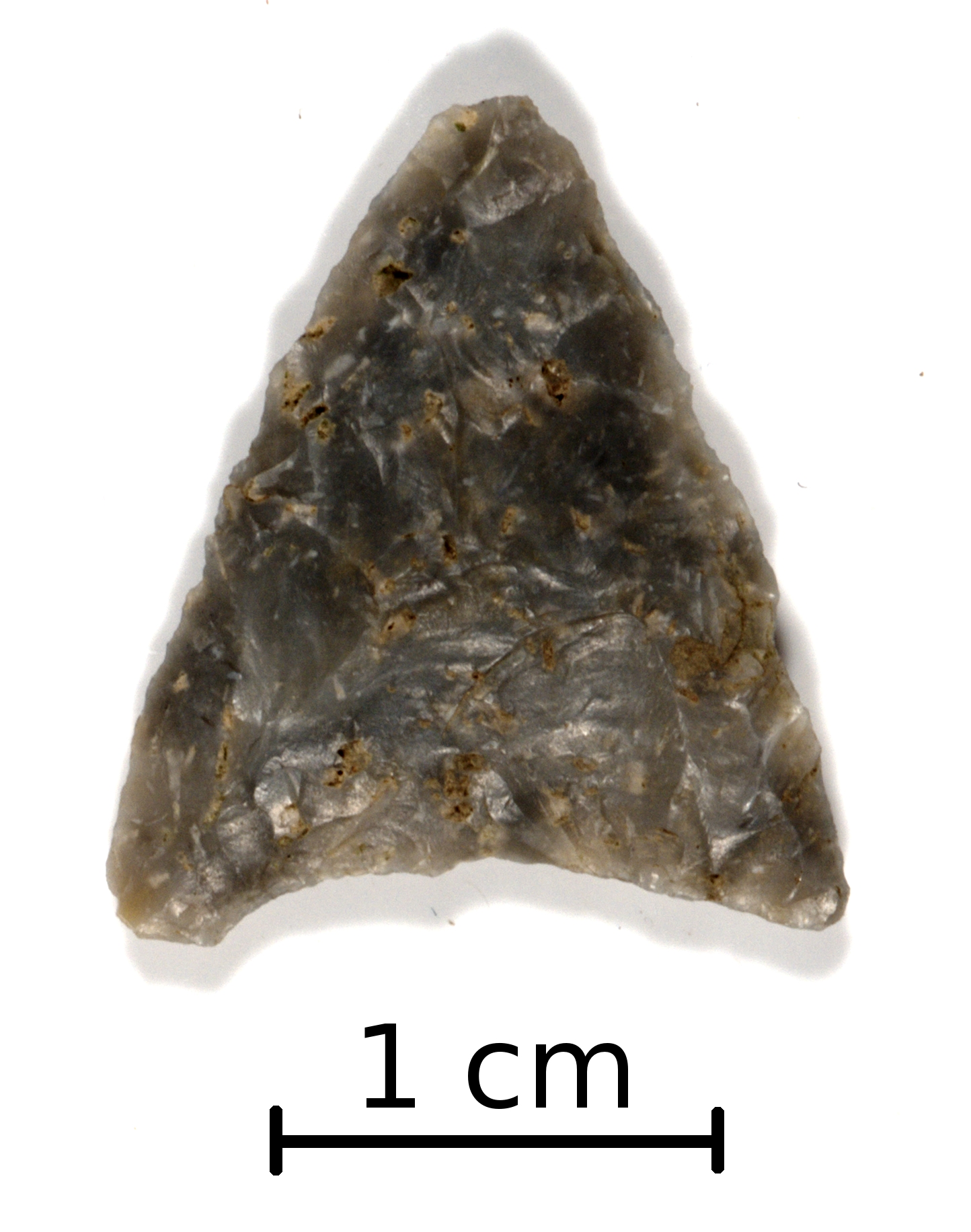
Levanna projectile point from central New York State

Levanna projectile points are stone projectile points manufactured by Native Americans what is now the Northeastern United States, generally in the time interval of 700-1350 AD. They are true arrowheads rather than atlatl dart points, and they derive their name from the specimens found at the Levanna site in Cayuga County, New York.

== Description ==
Levanna points are generally about 1 1/4 to 1 3/4 inches (30 to 45 mm) in length but may be as small as 7/8 inch (22 mm) to as large as 3 inches (76 mm). They are generally rather thin and triangular about as wide as they are long, and usually have a concave base. They are generally made from local flints, jasper, quartz and quartzite.

== Age and cultural affiliations ==
These points appeared in the American northeast around 700 AD and were very common from about 900 AD until around 1350 AD when it was replaced by the Madison projectile point. They are associated with the Owasco Indians and others, and their disappearance coincides roughly with the appearance of the Iroquois culture.

== Distribution ==
These points are found in much of New England, south eastern Ontario, the Middle Atlantic area, as far west as Virginia and eastern Pennsylvania.

== See also ==
- Other projectile points
