= St. Albans Site =

- U.S. National Register of Historic Places
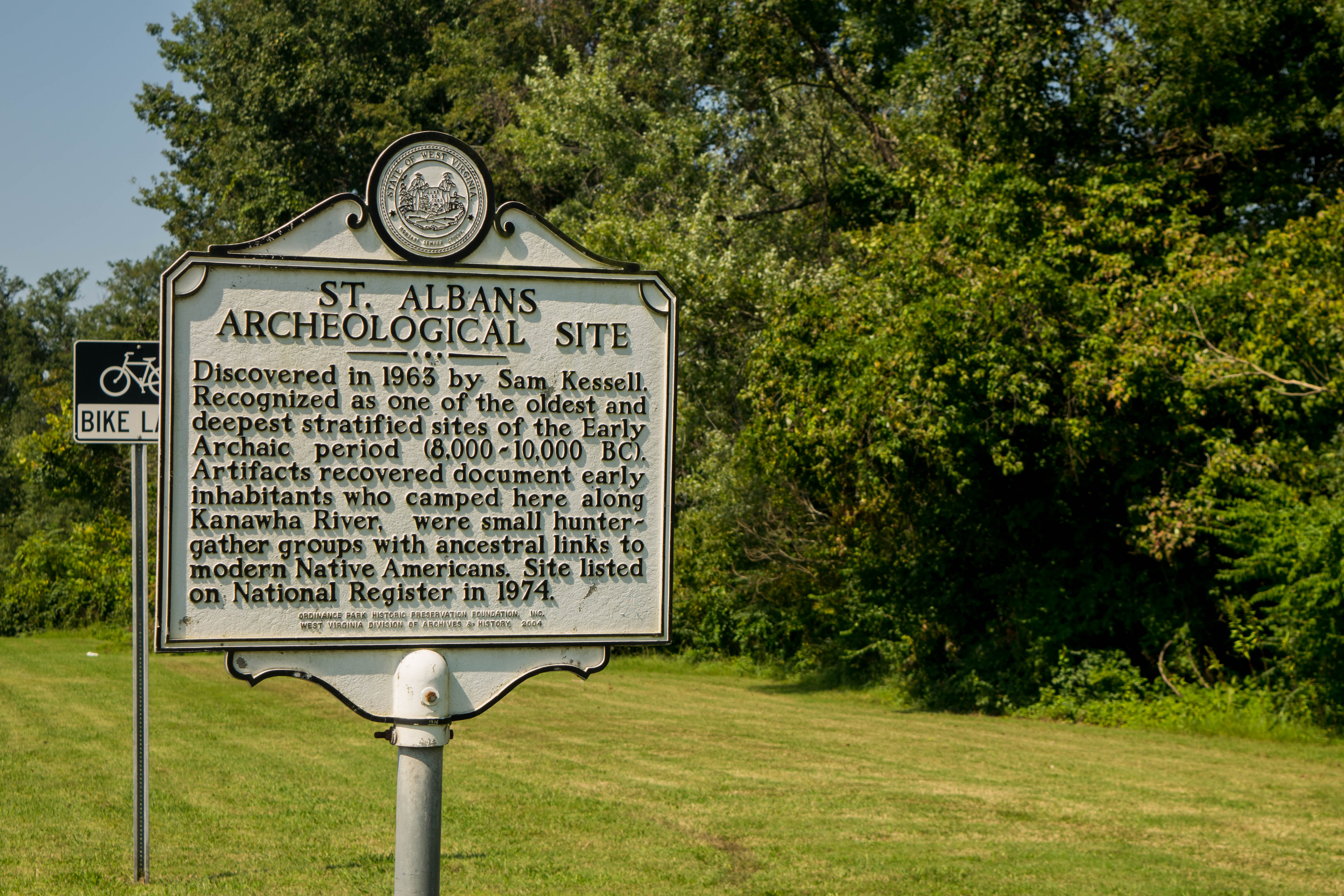
- Nearest city: St. Albans, West Virginia
- Area: 13 acres (5.3 ha)
- NRHP reference No.: 74002012
- Added to NRHP: May 3, 1974

St. Albans Site is a historic archaeological site located near St. Albans, Kanawha County, West Virginia. It was a camping site for prehistoric peoples between c. 12,000 B.C. and A.D. 1700. Excavations in 1964–1965, yielded projectile points ranging in age from 7900 t o 6210 B.C.

It was listed on the National Register of Historic Places in 1974.
