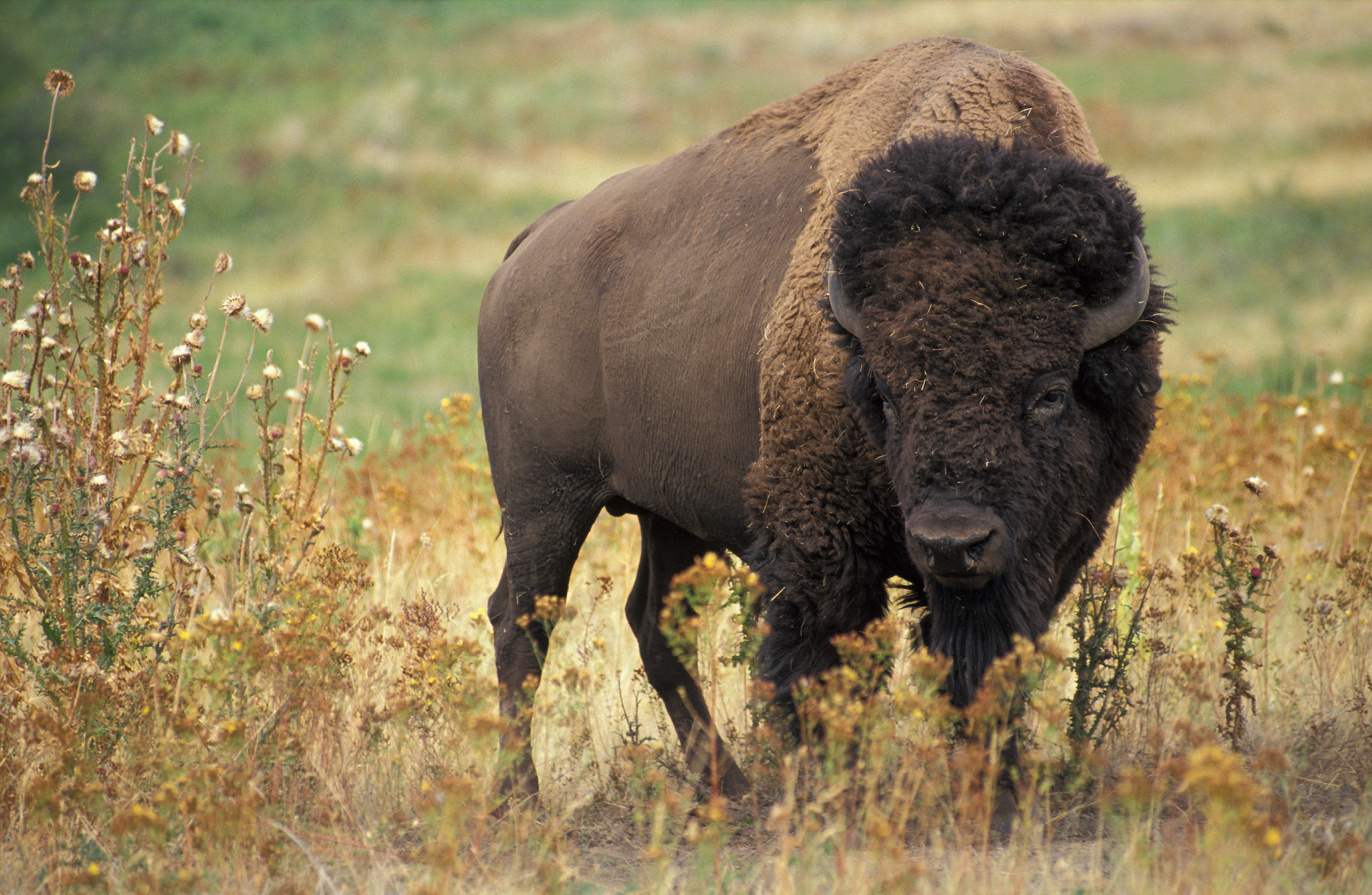

Conservation status
- Near Threatened (IUCN 3.1)

Scientific classification
- Kingdom: Animalia
- Phylum: Chordata
- Class: Mammalia
- Infraclass: Placentalia
- Order: Artiodactyla
- Family: Bovidae
- Subfamily: Bovinae
- Genus: Bison
- Species: B. bison
- Subspecies: B. b. bison

Trinomial name
- Bison bison bison (Linnaeus, 1758)
- IUCN range of the two American bison subspecies. Plains bison (Bison bison subsp. bison) Wood bison (Bison bison subsp. athabascae)

Synonyms
- Bison bison montanae

= Plains bison =

Subspecies of bison

The plains bison (Bison bison bison) is one of two subspecies/ecotypes of the American bison, the other being the wood bison (B. b. athabascae). (Note: It has been suggested that the plains bison consists of a northern (B. b. montanae) and a southern subspecies, bringing the total to three. However, this is generally not supported.) A natural population of plains bison survives in Yellowstone National Park (the Yellowstone Park bison herd consisting of an estimated 4,800 bison), while multiple smaller herds of bison have been reintroduced in many ranges within the midwestern and western United States (including Alaska, but not Hawaii) as well as southern portions of the Canadian Prairies.

== Near extinction and reintroduction ==
At least 25 million American bison were once spread across the United States and Canada, but by the late 1880s, the total number of bison in the United States had been reduced to fewer than 600, most of which lived on private ranches. The last known free-roaming population of bison consisted of fewer than 30 in the area that later became Yellowstone National Park. Although farmers and ranchers considered bison to be a nuisance, some people were concerned about the demise of this "North American icon", so individual landowners and zoos took steps to protect them. Some people saved bison with the express purpose of ranching or hunting them (see Antelope Island bison herd). Others, such as the American Bison Society, were also formed with the idea of saving the species and reintroducing them to natural range. Plains bison have since been reintroduced into a number of locations in North America. Five main foundation herds of American bison supplied animals intended to save them from extinction. The northernmost introduction occurred in 1928 when the Alaska Game Commission brought bison to the area of present-day Delta Junction. Bison taken from this transplant were also introduced to other Alaskan locations, including Farewell and Chitina. The Delta Junction herd prospered the most, with a population of several hundred throughout the late 20th century. This herd is popular with hunters interested in hundreds of pounds of high-quality meat, but has been a problem for farming operations in the area. Though American bison generally prefer grasslands and plains habitats, they are quite adaptable and live in conditions ranging from desert, as in the case of the Henry Mountains bison herd, to forested areas, such as those of the Yellowstone Park bison herd; yet, they are all of the same subspecies Bison bison bison. Currently, over 500,000 bison are spread over the United States and Canada, but most of these are on private ranches, and some of them have small amounts of hybridized cattle genes. Significant public bison herds that do not appear to have hybridized domestic cattle genes are the Yellowstone Park, the Henry Mountains, the Custer State Park, the Wind Cave, and the Wood Buffalo National Park bison herds and subsidiary herds descended from it in Canada.

Park officials transferred plains bison from Fort Niobrara National Wildlife Refuge to Theodore Roosevelt National Park's South Unit in 1956 and its North Unit in 1962 for population increase.

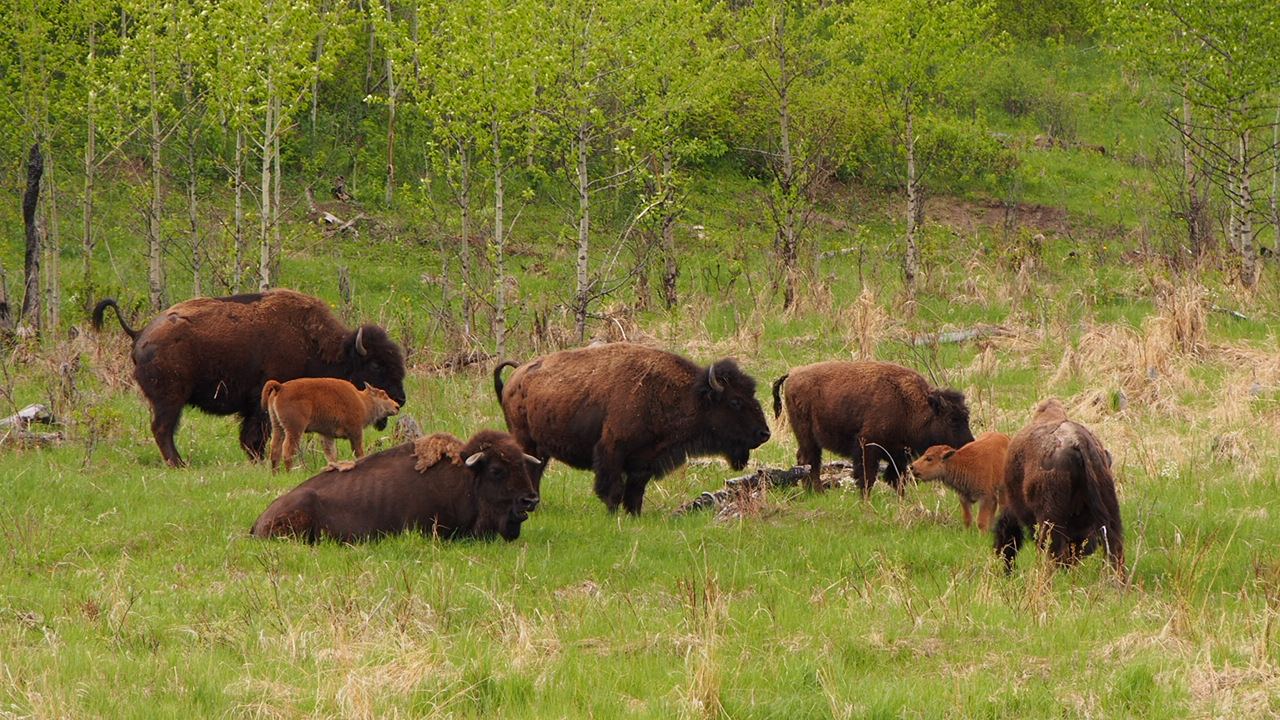
Herd of plains bison of various ages resting in Elk Island Park, Alberta

In 1969, plains bison from Elk Island National Park were released into Prince Albert National Park in Saskatchewan, creating the Sturgeon River bison herd. At a population around 300 animals, they form a free herd able to wander where they please. The bison are spread throughout Prince Albert National Park's southwestern corner, as well as some crown and private land in the area. In 2006, plains bison from Elk Island National Park in Alberta were released into Saskatchewan's Grasslands National Park. This marks the first time they have wandered the shortgrass prairies of Canada since their near extinction at the turn of the 20th century. According to the national agency Parks Canada, the entire breeding population of these wild and "semiwild" bison is descended from just eight individuals that survived the period of near extinction, due to overhunting and tuberculosis infecting the herd.

A herd of about 650 of these animals lives in, and can be seen at, the Wichita Mountains Wildlife Refuge near Lawton, Oklahoma. The herd was started in 1907 with stock from the New York Zoological Park, now known as the Bronx Zoo and located in the Bronx Park. Fifteen animals were shipped to Oklahoma, where bison had already become extinct due to excessive hunting and overharvesting by non-native commercial buffalo hunters from 1874 to 1878. Some of these specimens have been released in other areas of the United States, such as Paynes Prairie in Florida.

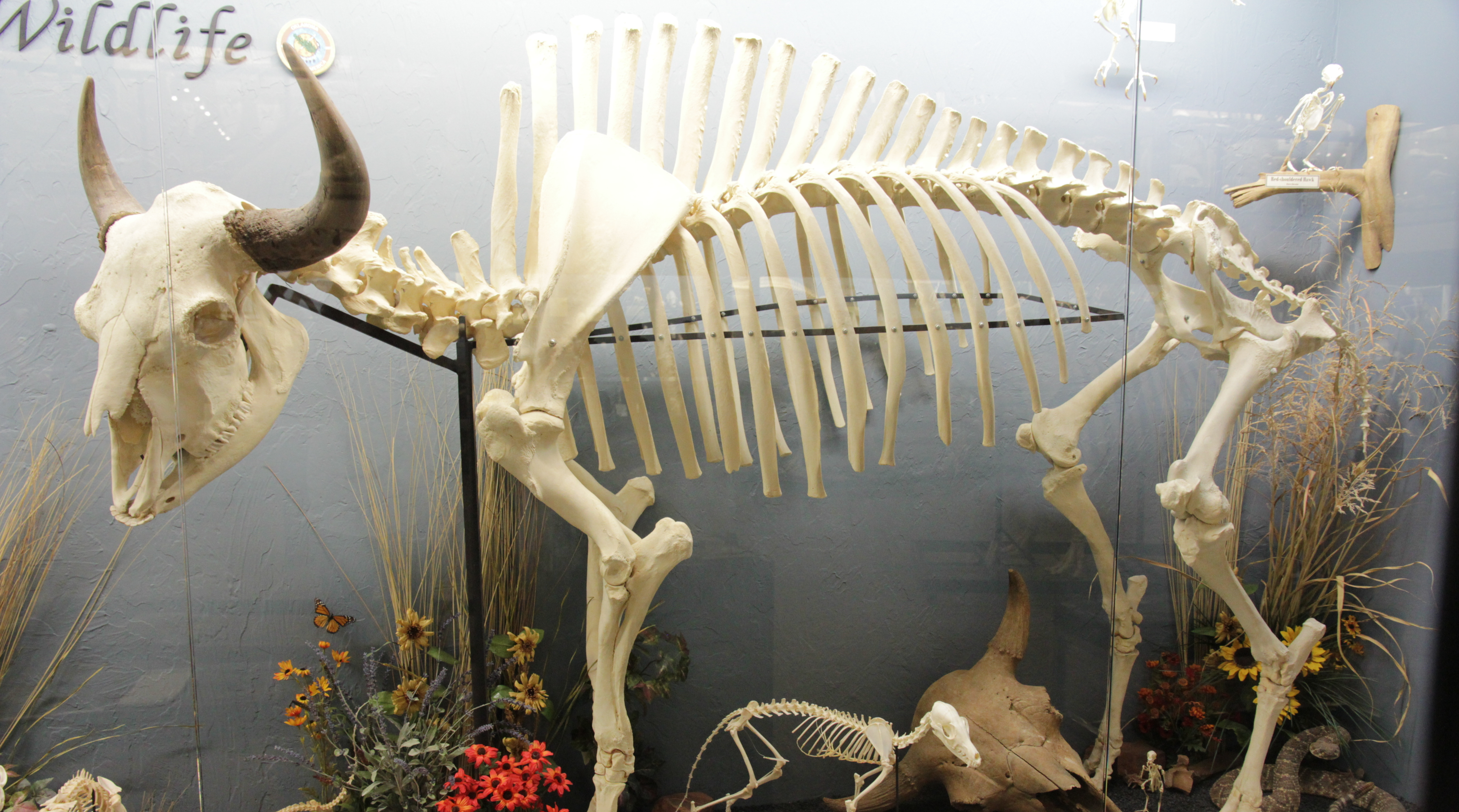
American bison skeleton (Museum of Osteology)

Only one southern plains bison herd was established in Texas. A remnant of the last of this relict herd had been saved in 1876. "Molly" Goodnight had encouraged her rancher husband, Charles Goodnight, to save some of the last bison which were taking refuge in the Texas Panhandle. By saving these few plains bison, she was able to establish a buffalo herd near the Palo Duro Canyon. This herd peaked at 250 in 1933. Bison of this herd were introduced into the Yellowstone National Park in 1902 and into the larger zoos and ranches throughout the nation. A herd of around 80 of these animals lives in the Caprock Canyons State Park near Quitaque, Texas, located about 50 miles northeast of Plainview, Texas.

Ted Turner owned America's largest secured bison herd in Cimarron, New Mexico's Vermejo Reserve. Boy Scouts of America own a private bison herd in Cimarron's Philmont Scout Ranch.

In 2013, bison were reintroduced to Fort Belknap Indian Reservation from Yellowstone National Park.

In 2019, a herd was established in Pleistocene Park in Northern Siberia.

A herd of plains bison were successfully reintroduced to Banff National Park in Alberta in early 2017. The bison were kept under observation in an enclosed pasture of the park until the summer of 2018, after which they have been allowed to roam free. Observation is to be continued until 2022 according to Parks Canada.

== Uses ==
Besides using the meat, fat, and organs for food, plains tribes have traditionally created a wide variety of tools and items from bison. These include arrow points, awls, beads, berry pounders, hide scrapers, hoes, needles from bones, spoons from the horns, bow strings and thread from the sinew, waterproof containers from the bladder, paint brushes from the tail and bones with intact marrow, and cooking oil from tallow. Skulls can be used ceremonially as altars. Rawhide is used for parfleches, shield covers, and moccasin soles. Hides with the fur are used for blankets, wraps, and warm clothing. Tanned hides, the finest of which are tanned with the animal's brains and then smoked, are used in clothing, moccasins, tipi covers, calendars, and artwork.

== See also ==
- Antelope Island bison herd
- Bison antiquus
- Bison bonasus
- Bison latifrons
- Bison occidentalis
- Bison priscus
- Bison hunting
- Bison
- Bovid hybrid
- Buffalo Commons
- Buffalo Hunters' War
- European bison
- Great bison belt
- Plains hide painting
- Red River War
- Steppe bison
- Wood bison
