= Olsen–Chubbuck Bison Kill Site =

The Olsen–Chubbuck Bison kill site is a Paleo-Indian site that dates to an estimated 8000–6500 B.C. and provides evidence for bison hunting and using a game drive system, long before the use of the bow and arrow or horses. The site holds a bone bed of nearly 200 bison that were killed, butchered, and consumed by Paleo-Indian hunters. The site is located 16 miles (26 km) southeast of Kit Carson, Colorado. The site was named after archaeologists, Sigurd Olsen and Gerald Chubbuck, who discovered the bone bed in 1957. In 1958, the excavation of the Olsen-Chubbuck site was then turned over to the University of Colorado Museum of Natural History, a team led by Joe Ben Wheat, an anthropologist employed by the museum.

== Discovery and Excavation ==
=== Chubbuck and Olsen ===
The site was first discovered by Gerald Chubbuck, a young archaeologist, in 1957 when he came across several Scottsbluff projectile points and five separate piles of bones at the northernmost area of the Arkansas River valley. He notified the University of Colorado Museum of Natural History of his discovery and recruited archaeologist Sigurd Olsen to perform an initial excavation. Together, they excavated the bones of about 50 bison from one third of the site in 1957.

=== Joe Ben Wheat, University of Colorado Museum ===
By the spring of 1958, the University of Colorado Museum was granted permission to excavate by the owner of the land, Paul Forward, and Chubbuck and Olsen. The excavations were led by Joe Ben Wheat between 1958 and 1960. Located in a dry gulch, or arroyo, the excavation dig was in an irregularly shaped area up to 12 feet (3.7 m) wide, 200 feet (61 m) long, and 7 feet (2.1 m) deep. Wheat and his team uncovered 143 more skeletal remains, bringing the total to nearly 200 Bison occidentalis. The total number of bison found included 16 calves, 27 immature bulls, 38 immature cows, 46 adult bulls, and 63 adult cows. Wheat's careful and detailed descriptions of the arroyo drive, kill site, butchering process, and consumption estimates set a standard for excavation of Paleo-Indian sites and won national attention.

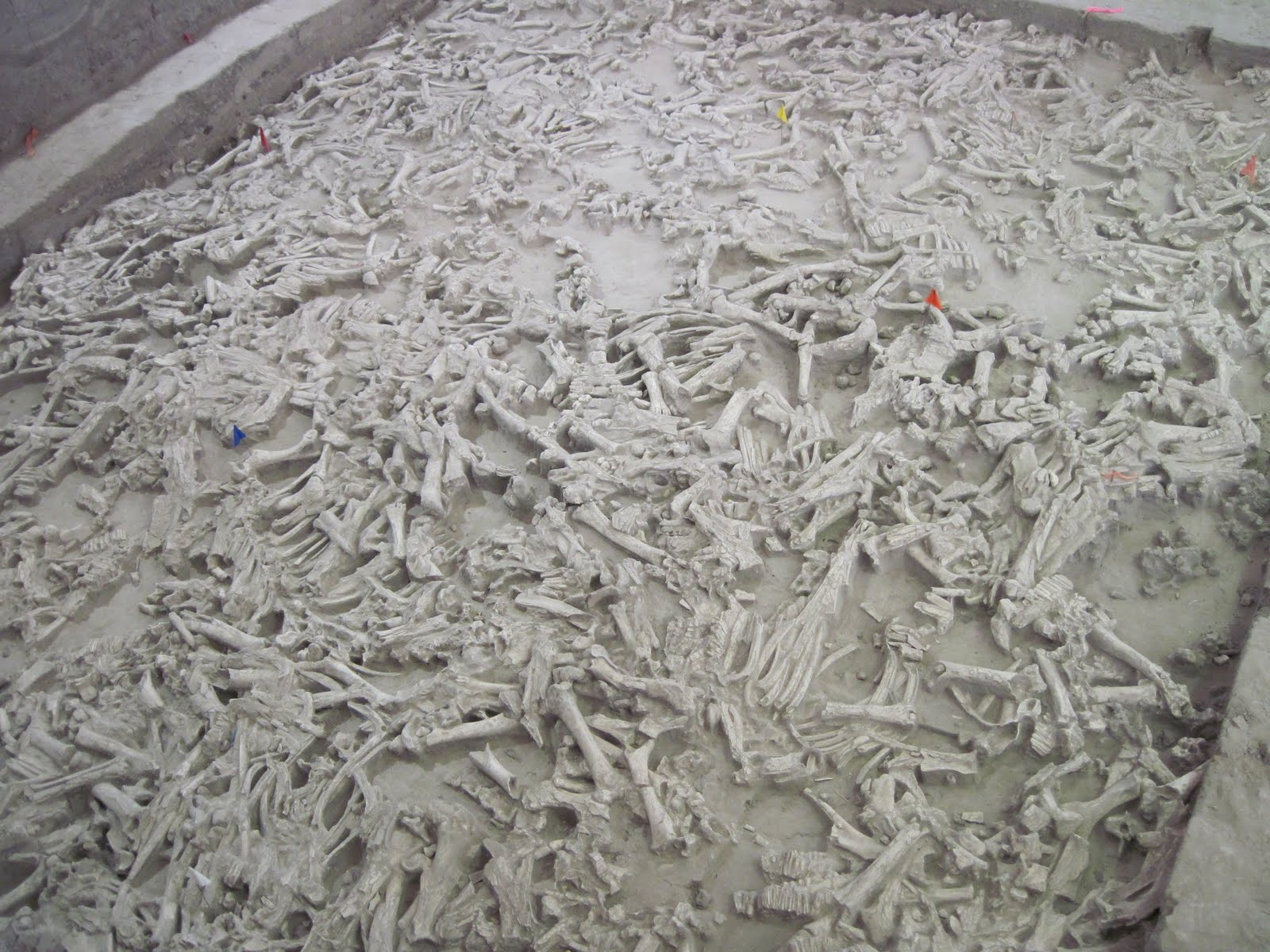

Bone bed of Bison antiquus remains

Image Source: SkybirdForever, Close-up of part of the exposed Bison antiquus bones inside of the climate controlled building. - Hudson-Meng Bison Bonebed, northwest Nebraska in the Oglala National Grasslands, 2010-06-16

Accessed via Hudson-Meng Bison Kill, (CC BY-SA 3.0)

== Bison Hunting and Stampede ==
=== History of Big-Game ===
Over 12,000 years ago in the New World, Paleo-Indian hunting groups' principal game animal was the Columbian mammoth. Mammoth remains were found with projectile points typically associated with the Clovis complex. By 8000 B.C., these mammoths had been hunted out, and straight-horned bison known as Bison antiquus took over as the main game animal. The remains of these bison were found with projectile points of the Folsom complex, points that are normally smaller and better made than Clovis points. Around 7000 B.C., Bison antiquus was replaced by Bison occidentalis, a somewhat smaller bison. The American lion and the American cheetah also disappeared around the same time. However, long-held suppositions that these animals were “hunted out” by humans are now being questioned, as many remains are found without telltale signs of human caused death due to knives or projectiles.

=== Hunting ===
Following the extinction of megafauna such as mammoths in the late Pleistocene, Bison became the primary game of native Paleo-Indians for food and other uses, including the use of hides for clothing and shelter. Relying on their sense of smell, bison traveled in search of food in herds of 50 to 300. Their poor eyesight allowed hunters to use a game drive system, in which they would get close to the herd and scare them, causing them to stampede into bison jumps or arroyo traps.

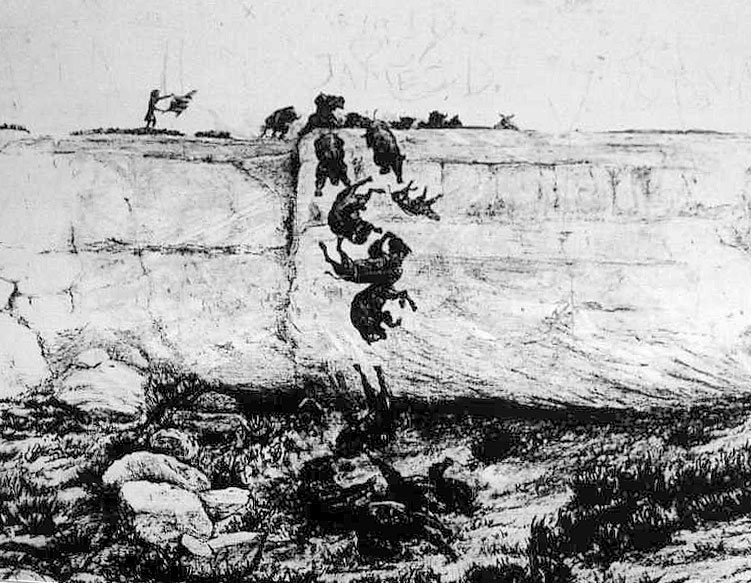

A drawing of a bison jump from 1900, (PD-US)

=== Stampede ===
From the positioning of the nearly 200 Bison occidentalis skeleton bones, it was found that they were stampeded by the hunters into the arroyo. The animals that plunged first were killed from the fall and their remains were contorted, with twisted spines, and covered by the following bison from the stampede. The bison were theorized to have run in a north-south direction with the hunters toward the southerly wind. The presence of 16 almost newborn calves means the kill was likely in late May or early July. The arroyo drive to cause the mass killing would have required significant "cooperative planning".

== Butchering and Consumption ==
=== Butchering ===
The site contained 3 distinct layers of bison remains: 1) a bottom layer of 13 untouched bison skeletons bison, 2) a middle layer of nearly complete or only partially butchered, skeletal remains, and 3) a top layer of butchered single bones and articulated bison skeletal segments. The top layer illustrated that as the Paleo-Indians methodically removed the meat from the bones they placed them in separate piles or units that contained the skeletal remains from several animals. The butchering process was similar, but much more methodical, to that of modern Plains Indians. Positioning the Bison occidentalis skeleton bones for butchering would have required a great deal of manual effort. The Olsen-Chubbuck hunters ate the tongues of the bison as they worked, given the isolated occurrences of tongue bone in the piles. It would have likely taken half a day for 100 people to butcher all of the bison.

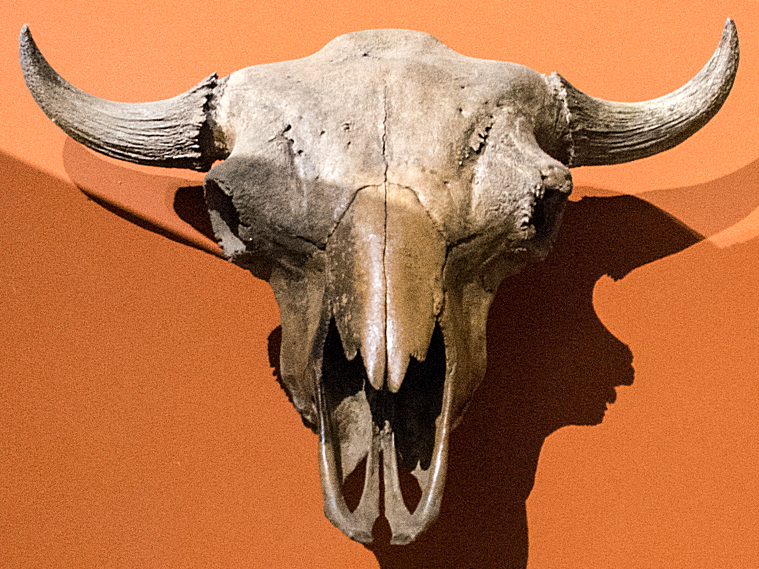

Skull of Bison Occidentalis

Image Source: Tim Evanson from Cleveland Heights, Ohio, USA, Cleveland Museum of Natural History, "bison occidentalis", 2014-12-26

Accessed via https://flickr.com/photos/23165290@N00/20528693984 (CC BY-SA 2.0)

=== Consumption ===
The amount of edible meat for each bison is 50 pounds for a young calf, 165 pounds for an immature male, 110 pounds for an immature female, 550 pounds for an adult male, and 400 pounds for an adult female. Based on the number of skeletal remains, it is estimated that the hunters obtained 56,640 pounds of meat and a significant amount of edible mass in the form of fat and internal organs from the bison. Knowing that fresh meat is only good for about a month, and assuming that a third of the meat was dried, the archaeologists estimated that the band would need to have about 150 adults and children to consume the remaining two-thirds of the fresh meat from this kill in that time.

The meat was likely dried for preservation, with 20 pounds of dried meat yielded from 100 pounds of fresh meat. It is thought that Paleo-Indians may have preserved butchered neck meat into pemmican, dried meat pounded into a powder, like later Plains Indians who found bison neck meat tough to eat.

== Cody Complex ==
The Olsen–Chubbock site is a Cody complex site, a Plano culture that existed 9,000 to 7,000 years ago in the Plains. Many of the artifacts found were similar to the set of tools used by the Clovis culture and Folsom tradition, such as knives, stone scrapers, and bone ornaments and needles. The Scottsbluff and Eden points, dated about 6,500 B.C. are of the Cody culture.

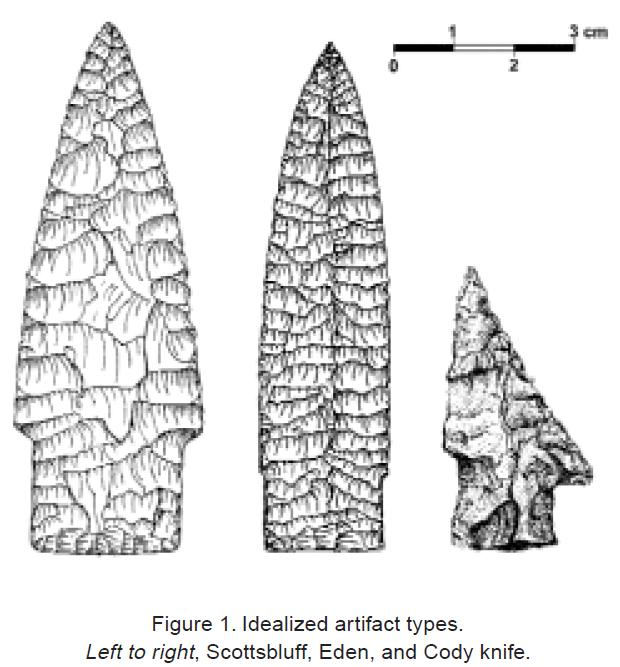

Three common tools of the Cody Complex

=== Artifacts ===
27 projectile points were found at the site, 21 of which were complete or almost whole. The points included Scottsbluff and Eden lanceolate points and Milnesand points.

Other artifacts were also found at the Olsen-Chubbuck kill site, including:

- 1 bifacial flaked knife and 1 Alibates knife
- 1 side-scraper and 3 end-scrapers
- 2 utilized flakes and 3 resharpening flakes
- 1 hammer/anvil stone
- 3 small stones, 1 limonite pebble, and 4 cut, notched or polished bones.

== See also ==
- List of prehistoric sites in Colorado
- Outline of Colorado prehistory
- Prehistory of Colorado
