= Jurgens Site =

Archaeological site in Colorado, United States

- U.S. National Register of Historic Places
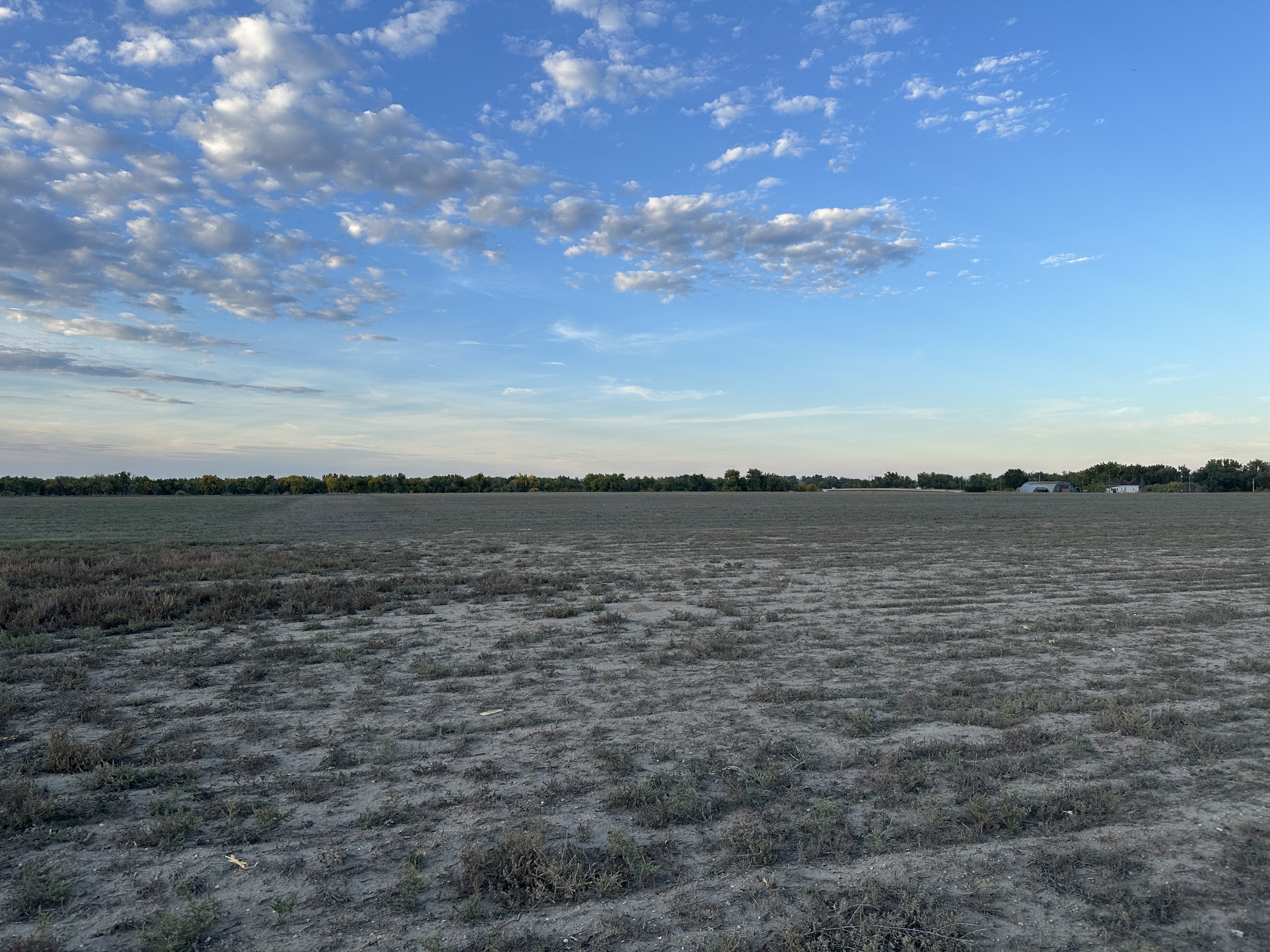
- Jurgens Site, riparian area along the South Platte in the distance.

- Location within Colorado Location within the United States
- Location: southern terrace of the South Platte River
- Nearest city: Kersey, Colorado
- Area: 12 acres (4.9 ha)
- MPS: Prehistoric Paleo-Indian Cultures of the Colorado Plains MPS
- NRHP reference No.: 90001084
- Added to NRHP: July 18, 1990

The Jurgens Site is a Paleo-Indian site located near Kersey in Weld County, Colorado. While the site was used primarily to hunt and butcher bison antiquus, there is evidence that the Paleo-Indians also gathered plants and seeds for food about 7,000 to 7,500 BC.

== Geography ==
The site is located on a South Platte River terrace in northeastern Colorado, 9 miles (14 km) east of Greeley near the town of Kersey. There are three sites located nearby; The Frazier site is 1 mile (1.6 km) away and the Dent site is 16 miles (26 km) southwest.

== History ==
=== Paleo-Indian ===
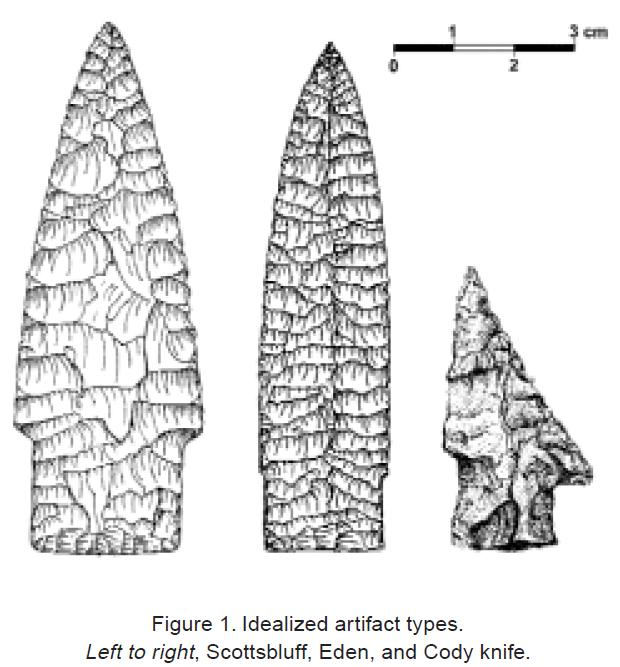
Cody complex projectile points and knife

Paleo-Indians were primarily hunters of large mammals, such as the Bison antiquus, during a transitional period from Ice Age to Ice Age summer. As the climate warmed, glacial run-off created lakes and savannas. At the end of the summer period the land became drier, food was not as abundant, and they became extinct. People adapted by hunting smaller mammals and gathering wild plants to supplement their diet.

The items found at the site were identified as Cody complex culture. (Note: The site is generally considered a Cody complex site from the noted sources, but is also called a Kersey complex, very similar to the Cody complex, after the nearby town of Kersey. See Kevin P. Gilmore, et al. "Colorado prehistory: a context for the Platte River Basin" for a more detailed analysis of the usefulness of a separate "Kersey complex" from the "Cody complex".) The Cody complex was first identified at a bison antiquus kill site near Cody, Wyoming in 1951. In addition to the Cody and Jurgens site, other Cody bison kill sites include Green River Basic (WY), Carter/Kerr-McGee (WY) and Frasca (CO). The sites are distinguished by their campsites, tools and butchering process. The tools, dated between about 6,000 and 8,000 BC, include Cody knives and Scottsbluff and diamond shaped Eden projectile points. Shaft abraders, used to straighten spear shafts, were found at the Jurgens Site and a few other Cody complex sites.

According to Noel Justice, the site was inhabited first by people of the Agate Basin Site culture and a second time by people defined as the "Kersey culture".

=== Bison kill site ===
Although bison antiquus were dying off as the result of climate changes at the end of the Ice Age, the Jurgens site was evidence of their ability to acquire significant numbers of bison about 7150 B.C.

=== Archaeology ===
==== Artifacts ====
Artifacts were found in distinct areas within the site:

Jurgens Site
Site	Artifact
Butcher station	Bison bones that were easily moved, excluding skulls and pelvic bones. Tools for killing and butchering.
Short term camp	A limited number items for hide preparation, tool creation and general domestic activities.
Residential area	Items for hide preparation, an area and slab for grinding seeds and plants, evidence of tool creation and general domestic activities.

There was also an area where tools were resharpened or replaced. In addition to the bison bones at the site, there were also butchered mammal (such as antelope, elk, deer), fish and bird bones.

Tools at the site included:

- 63 Kersey lanceolate projectile points, like the Eden projectile points. The raw material for the points was quartzite, found locally, and Alibates from northern Texas. (Note: Kersey points was a name assigned by Wheat, as well as definition of the culture as the Kersey culture.)
- 271 utilized and 2,023 debitage flakes
- 84 end scrapers
- 32 knives, some of which appear to have been fashioned from previous projectile points
- 30 ground-stone (anvil, hammerstone, etc.)
- 9 bone tools (atlatl hooks, an engraved unla, antler flaking hammer)
- 55 stone or mineral items

==== Excavation and studies ====
Jurgens Site
Date	Name	Comments
1965	Frank Frazier, a geologist	Frazier found the site while studying South Platte River gravel deposits.
1968, 1970	Joe Ben Wheat and, a research associate, Mary Wormington, from the University of Colorado Museum. Harold Malde, United States Geological Survey. A National Science Foundation project.	The site was identified as a combined kill and campsite. Artifacts were identified as Cody complex.

In 1967 Wormington excavated the Frazier site where she found Agate Basin Site (WY) artifacts and bison bones. Malde was the geologist on the Dent and Frazier sites.

== See also ==
- National Register of Historic Places listings in Weld County, Colorado
- List of prehistoric sites in Colorado
  - Game drive system

== Bibliography ==
- Dixon, E. James. (1999) Bones, Boats & Bison: Archaeology of the first colonization of western North America. University of New Mexico Press. ISBN 0-8263-2138-0.
- Gibbon, Guy E.; Ames, Kenneth M. Archaeology of Prehistoric Native America: An Encyclopedia. 1998. ISBN 0-8153-0725-X.
- Griffin-Pierce, Trudy. (2010). The Columbia Guide to American Indians of the Southwest. New York:Columbia University Press. ISBN 978-0-231-12790-5.
- Mandel, Rolfe D. (2000) Geoarchaeology in the Great Plains. Norman, OK: University of Oklahoma Press. ISBN 0-8061-3261-2
- Shortt, Mack W. Record of Early People on Yellowstone Lake: Cody Complex Occupation at Osprey Beach Yellowstone Science. 11(4). Retrieved 10-3-2011.
- Zimmerman, Larry J.; Vitelli, Karen D.; Hollowell-Zimmer, Julie. (2003) Ethical Issues in Archaeology. Walnut Creek, CA: AltaMira Press for the Society for American Archaeology. ISBN 0-7591-0270-8.
