= Joe Ben Wheat =

American archaeologist

Joe Ben Wheat (1916–1997) was an American archaeologist, curator, teacher, and author known for his expertise on woven textiles produced by the Navajo and other Native American tribes in Arizona, New Mexico, and Colorado. His research also focused on Mogollon, Anasazi, Great Plains Paleo-Indian, and African Paleolithic archaeology.

Wheat served as the president of the Society for American Archaeology between 1966 and 1967 and was the first curator of anthropology at the University of Colorado Museum, holding the position for thirty-five years. During this time, he taught at the University of Colorado in Boulder, contributed to numerous publications, and conducted excavations. Some of his most important field work includes the Joe Ben Wheat Site Complex at Yellow Jacket Canyon, the Olsen-Chubbuck Bison Kill Site, and the Jurgens Site.

== Personal life ==
Joe Ben Wheat was born April 21, 1916, and was raised in the town of Van Horn, Texas, by his parents, Luther Peers Wheat, a merchant, and Elizabeth Wheat, a housewife and schoolteacher. His exploration of the local countryside as a child piqued his interest in archaeology. Wheat married musician Frances Irene "Pat" Moore on April 6, 1947; she died in 1987. He later married Barbara Kile Zernickow in 1992. Joe Ben Wheat died of heart complications June 12, 1997, at the age of 81 and his ashes were scattered at his prized excavation site in Yellow Jacket Canyon.

== Early years ==
As a child, Wheat often explored the sand dunes near his home, looking for arrowheads and potsherds, sparking an early interest in archaeology. His frequent exposure to textiles such as the Navajo saddle blankets sold in his father's store and used by members of the Van Horn community similarly inspired a fascination with weaving that later grew into a passion. At thirteen years old, Wheat participated in an archaeological expedition near his hometown led by Victor J. Smith from Sul Ross State Teachers College (now Sul Ross State University). This provided him with the opportunity to engage with professional archaeologists, with whom he maintained contact with for some time.

Wheat first studied at Sul Ross Teachers College before transferring to Texas Technological College (now Texas Tech University). During his time at Sul Ross, he designed and created exhibits at a local museum. It was at Texas Tech that Anthropology professor William Curry Holden influenced him to pursue an education in anthropology at the University of California, Berkeley, where he received his bachelor's degree in 1937 having studied under the likes of Alfred Kroeber and Robert Lowie. Wheat accepted an archaeology position at Texas Tech as a field director for the Works Progress Administration in 1939, where he worked until World War II.

In 1941 he joined the United States Army Air Forces and served four years of duty, during which time he became Master Sergeant. Wheat was stationed in multiple locations during these years, including Salina, Kansas, where he originally met Barbara. His archaeological background and pilot's license led to him initially doing aerial photography before receiving a promotion into communications. Soon after that promotion, he was recruited into intelligence, which he worked in for the rest of the war. Eventually, Wheat ended up in the Pacific theater with the 499 bombing group, spending around a year in Saipan.

After the war, Wheat briefly studied at the Kansas City Art Institute to develop the skills necessary to illustrate archaeological field reports. In 1947 he worked for the Smithsonian Institution River Basin Surveys, where he became familiar with the Smithsonian nomenclature for archaeological site numbering, a method in which he made useful later in his career at the Yellow Jacket Colorado excavation site. He also married Pat in 1947, after which he began his graduate career in anthropology at the University of Arizona, earning his M.A. in 1949 and Ph.D. in 1953. During that time, he also worked as an instructor of anthropology and field foreman at the Point of Pines archaeological field school for the university. His dissertation of his work at Crooked Ridge Village was the basis for two publications, which have become standards in Mogollon archaeology. From 1952 to 1953 he was a ranger and archaeologist with the U.S. National Park Service at the Grand Canyon.

== Career at University of Colorado ==
Shortly after graduating in 1953 he was hired as the first curator of anthropology by the University of Colorado Museum of Natural History, a role he held for the remainder of his career. The prospect of working with Earl H. Morris was what originally drew him to the position. He also started working as an assistant professor at the University of Colorado in Boulder, Colorado the same year. In 1957 Wheat became an associate professor and five years later a professor of natural history, a position he maintained until his retirement in 1988. Throughout his career he was part of many memberships, organizations, and review boards. Most notably, beginning in 1966 he served two years as president of the Society for American Archaeology.

=== Excavations ===
In 1953, shortly after being elected the curator of the University of Colorado Museum, Wheat and the museum received pottery found at the site of a house that had burned down with a letter from a farmer of Yellow Jacket, Colorado. Wheat recognized that the pottery was probably dated AD 500-750 and accepted the offer, which would allow him to study early pit-house sites of the Mesa Verde region. Previously named "The Stevenson Site" after the farmer who had found the pottery, Wheat changed the original name to a methodical name using the Smithsonian nomenclature, 5MT1. (Note: 5MT1 consists of 1) the number "5" for the state of Colorado, 2) the two letter abbreviation of "MT" for Montezuma County, and 3) a sequentially assigned site number, "1" for the first excavation.) Wheat's work at Yellow Jacket spanned over 30 years (1954–1991). These three sites, 5MT1-3, had unusual and interesting features never been seen before and were a great discovery of the Mesa Verde region. During this long excavation period at Yellow Jacket Wheat also worked on other excavation sites, such as the Olsen-Chubbuck Bison Kill Site from 1958 to 60 and the Jurgens Site from 1968 to 70.

=== Sabbatical ===
In 1972 Wheat took a sabbatical to conduct research on Southwest textiles. He examined hundreds of chemical tests on yarns and visited many museums to study thousands of 19th century textiles, with the goal of establishing "a key for southwestern textiles identification based on the traits that distinguish the Pueblo, Navajo, and Spanish American blanket weaving traditions and provide a better way of identifying and dating pieces of unknown origin.” The years of research resulted in the "groundbreaking" publication of "Blanket Weavings in the Southwest" which was released six years after his death with editorial help by Ann Hedlund, a respected textile scholar and protégée of Wheat.

== Key excavations ==
- Joe Ben Wheat Site Complex at Yellow Jacket, Colorado: Joe Ben Wheat spent nearly his entire career excavating this location. It consists of three major sites 5MT1, 5MT2, and 5MT3.
  - 5MT1: It was the first of the Yellow Jacket excavation sites. It has an occupation that dates back to A.D. 675-700 represented by four semi-subterranean habitation structures and two arcs of work and storage rooms arranged around two small plazas.
  - 5MT2: The research at this site was focused on exposing contemporaneous household occupations. The excavations exposed two small hamlets that were successively occupied in the period of A.D. 1160-1280.
  - 5MT3: The largest of the three sites excavated, it is multi-component pueblo with occupation components dating between A.D. 600-1300. The site consists of four pit-house structures with associated storage rooms. The site was abandoned for three centuries then became occupied again.
- Olsen-Chubbuck Bison Kill Site: It dates to about 8000-6500 B.C. Skeletal remains of 190 bison were found in an ancient arroyo, in association with 27 Plano points, a few scrapers, and other ancient artifacts. Wheat has suggested that the number of people involved in the butchering and consumption was probably 150-200.
- Jurgens Site: is a Late Paleo-Indian Cody complex site on a South Platte River terrace in Northeastern Colorado. It was the scene of extensive bison-procurement located on a long term habitation, a short term camp, and a butchering station. Among the 2,635 stone and bone artifacts recovered were 63 Kersey points, 32 knives, 84 end scrapers, 30 ground stone tools, 55 stone or mineral specimens, 271 utilized flakes, 2,023 debitage flakes, and 9 bone artifacts.

== Memberships and employment ==
The following is a list of Wheat's additional employment and association membership information:

Consulting

- Consultant to McGraw-Hill Publishers, 1966.
- John Wesley Powell lectureship of American Association for the Advancement of Science, 1969.
- Consultant to Time-Life Publications, 1972--.

Fellowship and grants

- Ford Foundation fellowship, 1952-53.
- National Science Foundation grants, 1961–65, 1968-69.
- Smithsonian Institution research grants, 1962–63, 1966–67.

Associations and conferences

- American Anthropological Association (fellow).
- American Association for the Advancement of Science (fellow).
- American Ethnological Society
- National Foundation of Arts and Humanities, member of project review board, 1971.
- Plains Anthropological Conference, Chair, 1960.
- Society for American Archaeology (President, 1966–67).

== Selected publications ==
- Hedlund, Ann (1993) Why Museums Collect, Papers in Honor of Joe Ben Wheat Archaeological Society of New Mexico, Vol. 19.
- Wheat, J.B. Blanket Weaving in the Southwest, edited by Ann Lane Hedlund, University of Arizona Press (Tucson, AZ), 2003.
- Wheat, J.B. Prehistoric People of the Northern Southwest, Grand Canyon Natural History Association, revised edition, 1963.
- Wheat, J.B. An Archaeological Survey of Addicks Dam Basin, U.S. Government Printing Office, 1953.
- Wheat, J.B. Crooked Ridge Village, University of Arizona Press, 1954.
- Wheat, J.B. & Irwin, H.T. & Irwin, L.F. University of Colorado Investigations of Paleolithic and Epipaleolithic Sites in the Sudan, Africa, University of Utah Press, 1968.
- Wheat, J.B. The Olsen-Chubbuck Site: A Paleo-Indian Bison Kill, Society for American Archaeology, 1972.
- Wheat, J.B. The Gift of Spiderwoman: Southwestern Textiles, the Navajo Tradition, University of Pennsylvania (Philadelphia, PA), 1984.
