= Colorado Museum of Natural History =

Colorado Museum of Natural History may refer to either

- University of Colorado Museum of Natural History at the University of Colorado in Boulder, Colorado
- the former name of the Denver Museum of Nature and Science in Denver, Colorado
