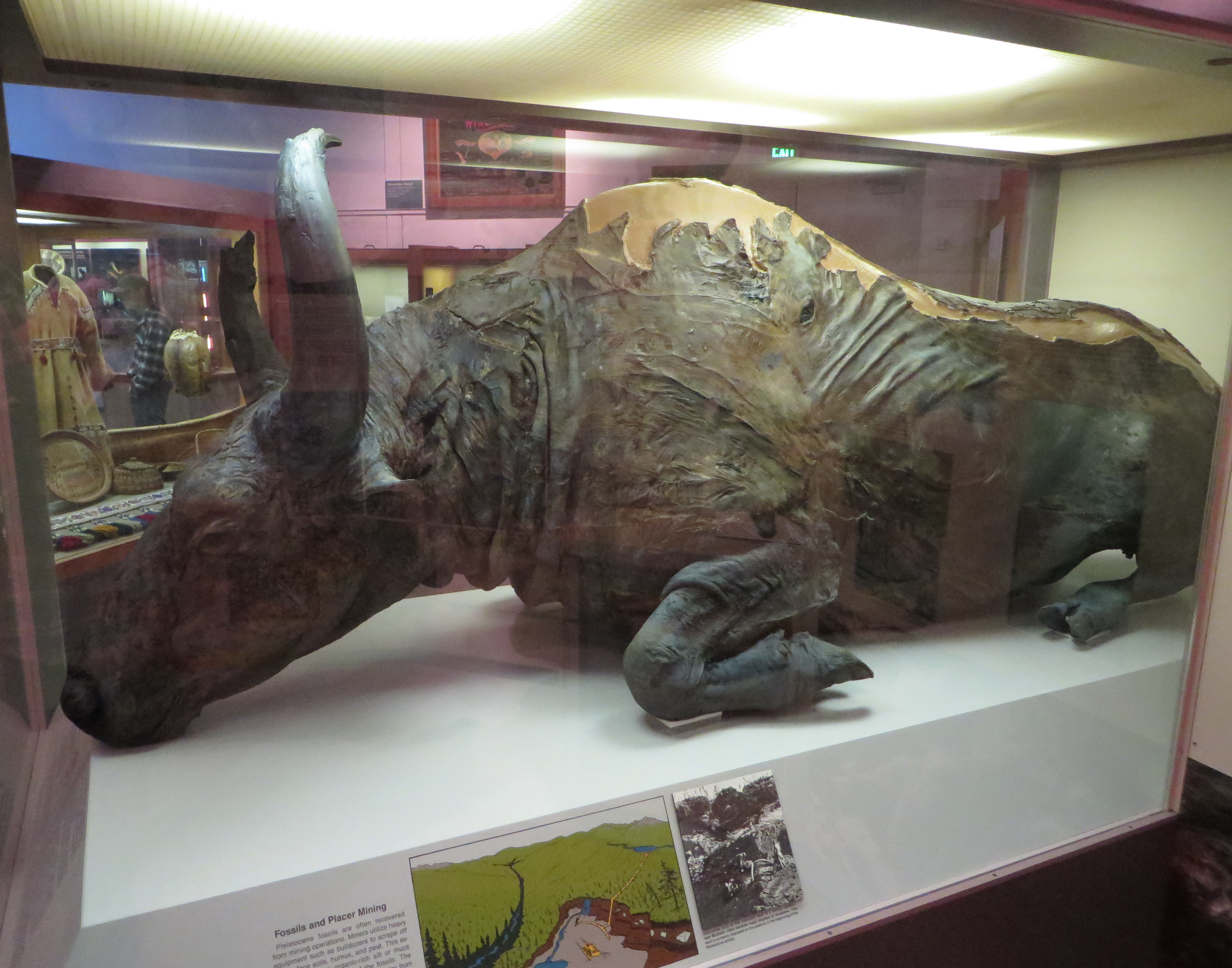
- "Blue Babe", a mummified specimen from Alaska

Scientific classification
- Kingdom: Animalia
- Phylum: Chordata
- Class: Mammalia
- Order: Artiodactyla
- Family: Bovidae
- Subfamily: Bovinae
- Genus: Bos
- Subgenus: Bison
- Species: †B. priscus

Binomial name
- †Bison priscus (Bojanus, 1825)

Synonyms
- Urus priscus Bojanus, 1825

= Steppe bison =

Steppe bison Temporal range: Middle Pleistocene to Holocene 0.65–0.003 Ma

Extinct species of mammal

The steppe bison (Bison priscus, also known as the steppe wisent and the primeval bison) is an extinct species of bison that lived from the Middle Pleistocene to the Holocene. During the Late Pleistocene, it was widely distributed across the mammoth steppe, ranging from Western Europe to eastern Beringia in North America.

It is ancestral to all North American species of bison, including ultimately the modern American bison (Bison bison). Three chronological and regional subspecies, B. p. priscus, B. p. mediator, B. p. gigas, and B. p. alaskensis have been suggested.

== Taxonomy and evolution ==
The steppe bison was first named in 1825 by French-German anatomist and naturalist Ludwig Heinrich Bojanus, this publication also notably coined the scientific name of the aurochs (Bos primigenius). The original combination was Urus priscus. Bojanus originally described the species based on series of specimens (syntype) rather than a singular holotype specimen, though he did not describe each specimen individually or provide illustrative figures of them in the paper. In 1918, Hilzheimer decided to make one of the specimens that Bojanus examined, given the name "Example No. 3", as the lectotype specimen, which has been followed by later authors. This specimen, held in the collections of the University of Pavia, is a nearly complete skull from the sediments of the Po Valley in Lombardy, northern Italy. In a 1947 publication, it was stated that at that time "European and Asiatic writers use the name B. priscus almost universally for any fossilized bison skull."

Steppe bison are divided into three chronologically successive subspecies, Bison priscus gigas from the early Middle Pleistocene of Siberia and Eastern Europe, Bison priscus priscus from the late Middle Pleistocene spanning from Western Europe to Siberia, and the Late Pleistocene Bison priscus mediator. There is another Steppe bison subspecies that has been suggested, Bison priscus alaskensis, a North American subspecies ranging from Alaska to Texas, though its taxonomic status has been debated. Some consider it a distinct species, Bison alaskensis.

=== Evolution ===
The steppe bison first appeared during the mid Middle Pleistocene in eastern Eurasia, subsequently dispersing westwards as far as Western Europe. Steppe bison first entered northwest North America (Eastern Beringia, comprising Alaska and Yukon) around 195,000–135,000 years ago during the Penultimate Glacial Period (equivalent to the Illinoian) at the end of the Middle Pleistocene, and then entered central North America at the beginning of the Last Interglacial (Sangamonian) around 130,000 years ago, following the melting of the Laurentide Ice Sheet. A B. priscus population would later evolve into the long-horned bison (Bison latifrons) around 120,000 years ago, and subsequently a population of B. latifrons into Bison antiquus by 60,000 years ago in central North America. B. antiquus is widely considered to be the ancestor of modern American bison (Bison bison). During the Last Glacial Period, steppe bison continued to inhabit Alaska and Yukon, separated from B. latifrons and B. antiquus by the reformed Laurentide Ice Sheet which formed an effective barrier to dispersal by 75,000 years ago, with genetic evidence indicating a second migration of steppe bison into Alaska and Yukon from Asia around 45-21,000 years ago. At the end of the Pleistocene in Eastern Beringia, the steppe bison is suggested to have likely given rise to Bison occidentalis proper.

== Description ==
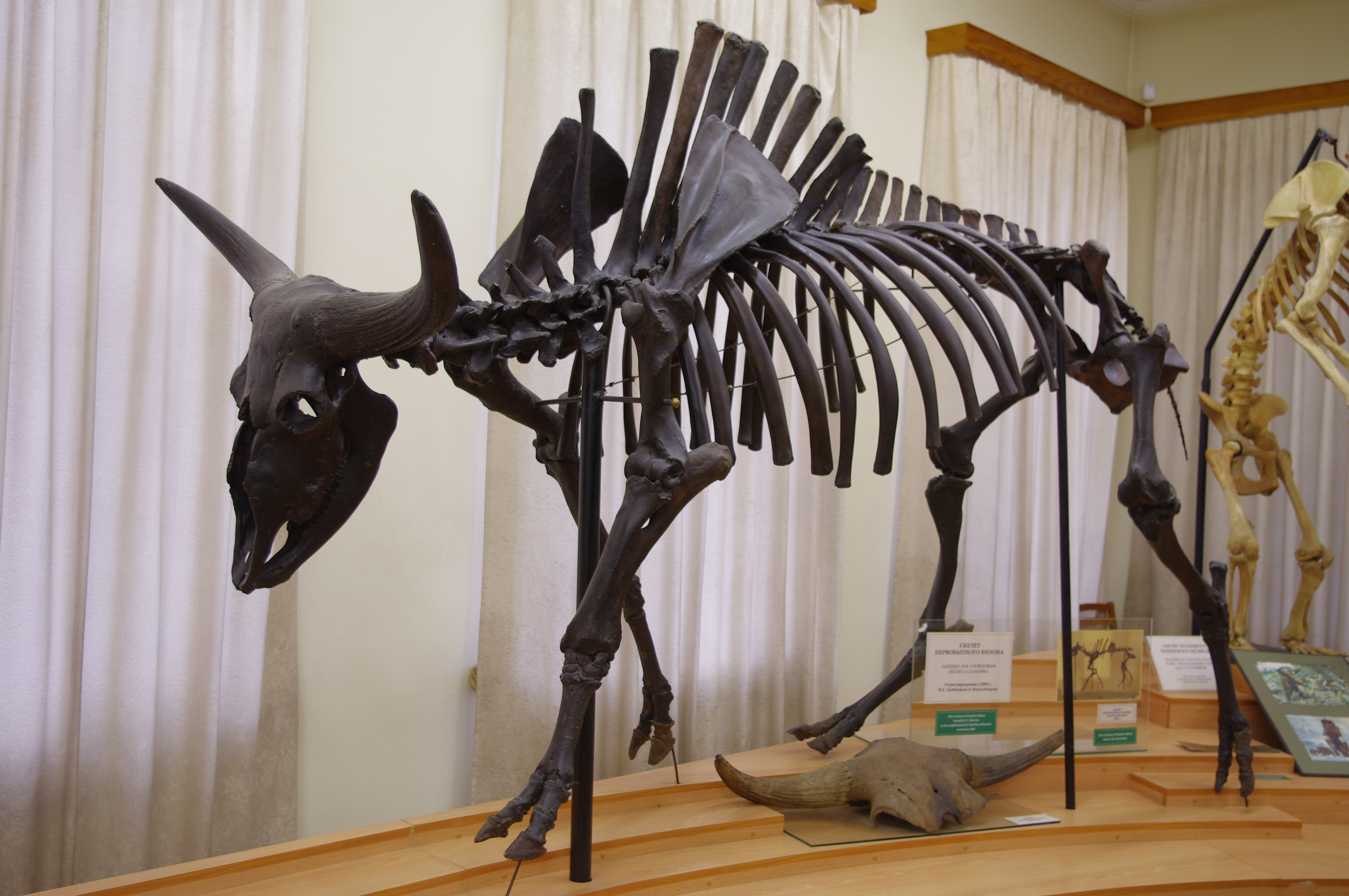
Skeleton of a steppe bison

Resembling the modern bison species, especially the American wood bison (Bison bison athabascae), adult bull steppe bison could likely reach over 2 m (6 ft 7 in) tall at the withers, and over 1,000 kg (2,200 lb) in weight. The steppe bison is also anatomically similar to the European bison (Bison bonasus), to the point of difficulty distinguishing between the two when complete skeletons are unavailable. Like living bison species, the steppe bison had a hump on its back immediately above its front legs.

Skulls of steppe bison are distinguished from those living bison and other extinct Bison species by the shape of their horn cores (the bony inner part of the horn). The horn cores of adult steppe bison generally project laterally outwards to the sides and curve upwards towards their tips. The size of steppe bison horn cores varied between subspecies, with the earliest subspecies Bison priscus gigas having horn cores that spread 1.4–2.1 m (4 ft 7 in – 6 ft 11 in) tip to tip, with this breadth progressively declining in later subspecies, down to 0.9–1.36 m (2 ft 11 in – 4 ft 6 in) in Bison priscus priscus, and to less than 0.9 m (2 ft 11 in) in the final subspecies Bison priscus mediator, corresponding with a body size decease between B. priscus gigas and B. priscus mediator, though the average breadth of the tips of the horn cores is still on average larger than those of living bison even in Late Pleistocene steppe bison.

The hair of the mummified "Yukagir bison" specimen is similar to living bison, but generally denser with the hair on the head varying from light brown to black depending on position, with the mane being almost black. The body hair of the "Yukagir bison" is generally shorter than the living American bison, consisting of light brown under hairs and black guard hairs.

== Palaeoecology ==
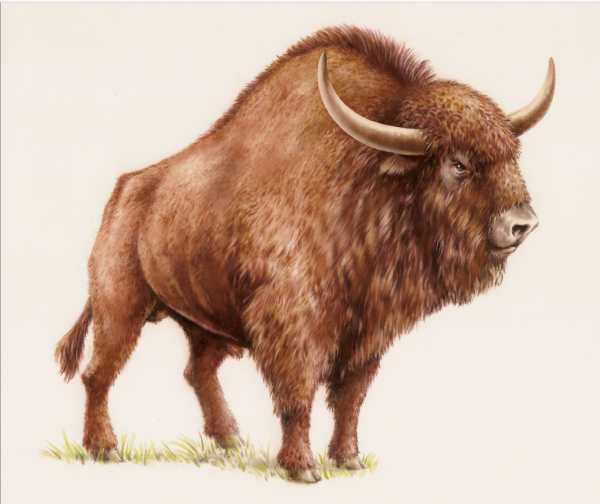
Life restoration

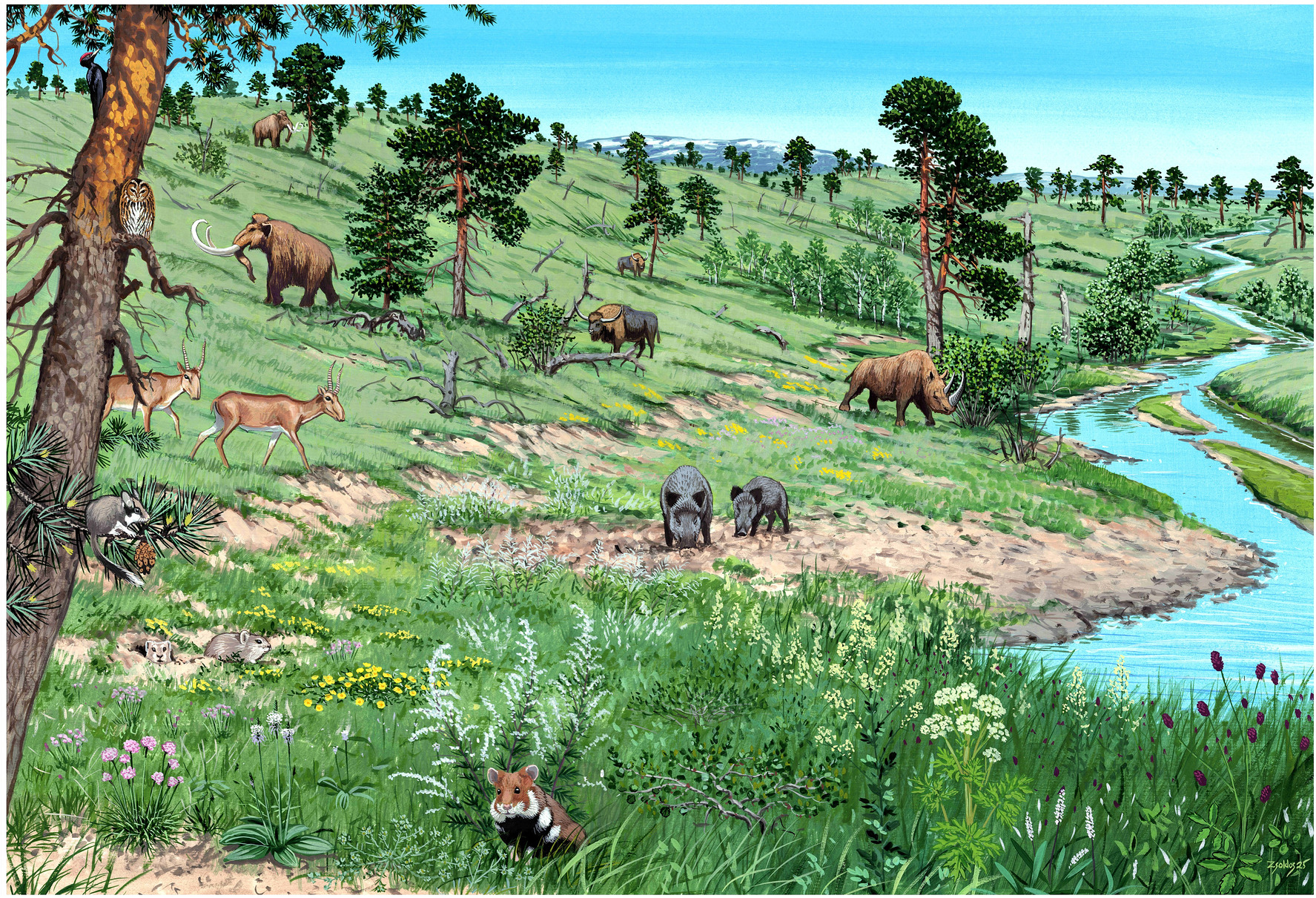
Steppe bison (background centre) in a Last Glacial Period Central European landscape scene, along with saiga antelope, woolly rhinoceros, woolly mammoth, wild boar, European hamster, garden dormouse, black woodpecker and tawny owl

The steppe bison lived on the mammoth steppe, one of the most expansive biomes in Earth's history stretching from Spain to Canada and from the Arctic islands to China. It was a highly productive environment being at the productivity theoretical maximum for an ecosystem at its northern location supporting many plants, herbivores and predators. Like other bison species, steppe bison are thought to have lived in herds.

=== Diet ===
Dental microwear analysis of specimens from across Eurasia and Alaska suggests the steppe bison was a mixed feeder, with its diet including a substantial amount of browse, rather than a strict grazer like the living American bison, although its feeding habits did vary locally. At some sites like La Berbie in France shows evidence of predominantly grazing behaviour. Isotopic analyses of Ukrainian steppe bison populations has found that C_{4} plants only made up about 37% of their overall diet. Another method for determining the diets of steppe bison is through DNA extraction of the stomach and intestines of frozen mummy specimens. A frozen mummy from the Kolyma Lowland had DNA samples extracted from its intestines revealing the last meals of that bison. It showed that the diet of this individual had been primarily composed of forbs (63.27%) and graminoids (36.58%) with other plants such as alkali grasses (Puccinellia) and larch (Larix) being found. Ancient DNA samples taken from the rumen of a bison from the Yukutia show the remains of grass and shrubs such as alder (Alnus), birch (Betula) and willow (Salix). There were also remains of Comarum palustre (marsh cinquefoil), Caltha palustris (marsh-marigold), Eriophorum (cottongrass), Sparganium (bur-reed), Menyanthes trifoliata (commonly known as buck/bogbean or marsh trefoil) and Utricularia (bladderwort) found in its rumen.

=== Predators ===
Likely predators of steppe bison include cave hyenas, whose dens have been found to contain steppe bison remains, cave lions, whose bite marks have been found on the frozen mummified "Blue Babe" specimen from Alaska, scimitar toothed cats (Homotherium) and possibly wolves.

=== Relationship with humans ===
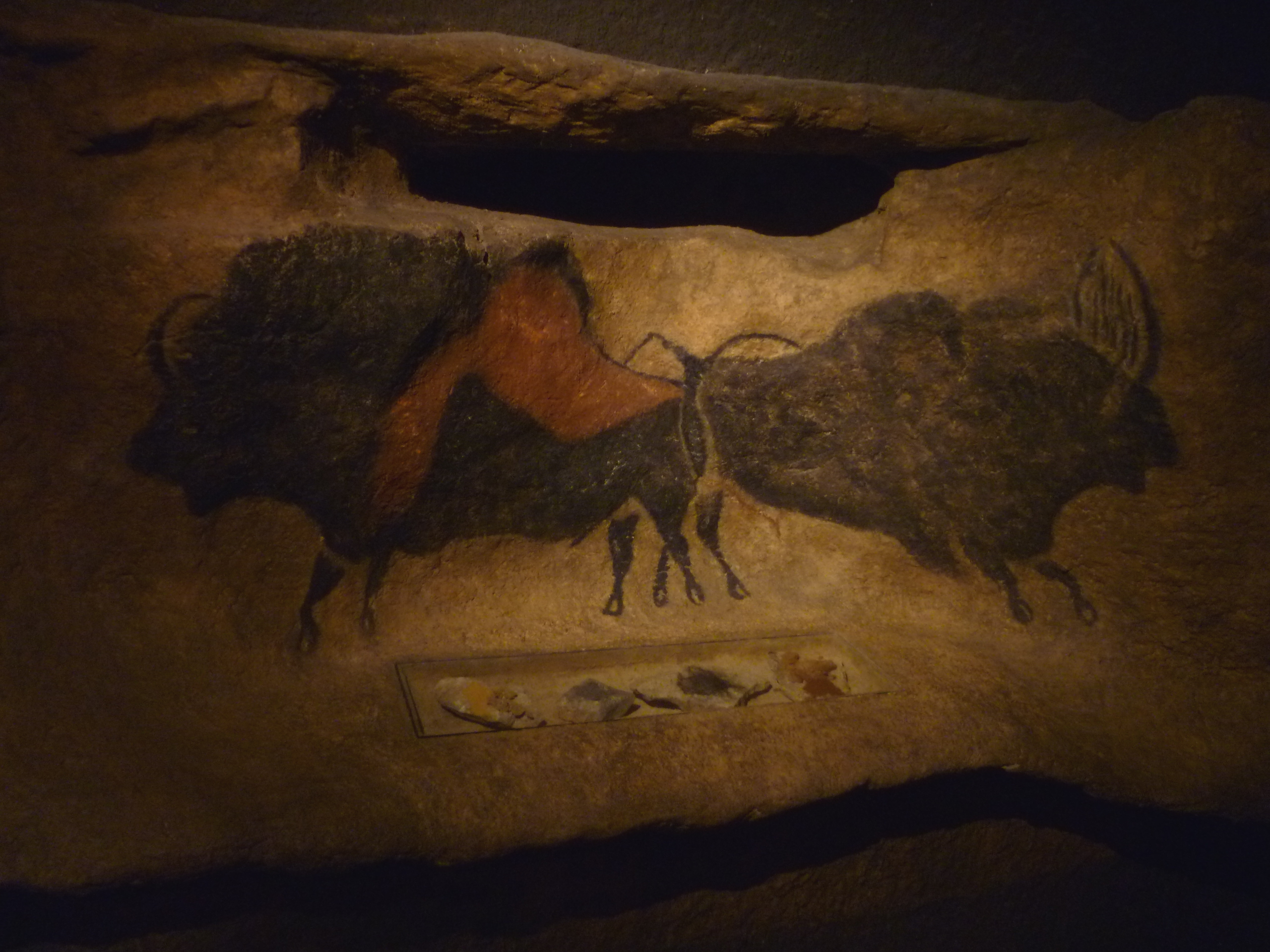
Cave art of bison at Lascaux cave, France

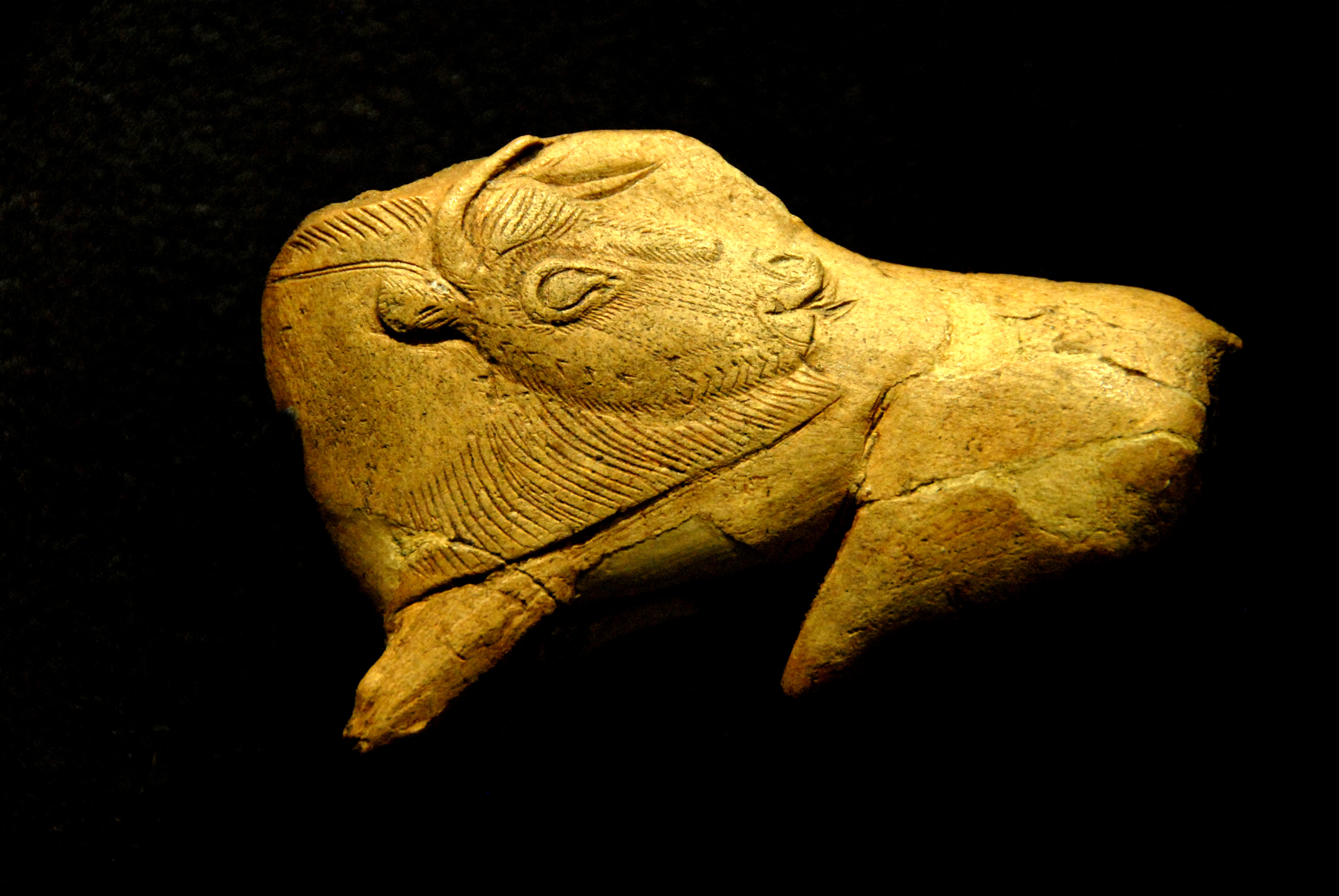
"Bison licking insect bite", a well known French Paleolithic carving of a bison made of reindeer antler

Steppe bison are known to have been hunted by Neanderthals during the Middle Paleolithic in Europe, and at some carcass accumulations associated with Neanderthals are among the most common herbivores. Modern humans are known to have fed on steppe bison during the Last Glacial Period, with their processed remains having been found in Upper Palaeolithic archaeological sites. Steppe bison were depicted by Paleolithic Europeans in cave art, with artists apparently distinguishing between steppe bison (depicted at sites like Lascaux cave, Chauvet Cave and Trois-Frères cave in France), and European bison, which co-occurred in Europe with steppe bison, with suggested depictions of steppe bison more common in early Upper Paleolithic cave art, prior to the Magdalenian, when suggested depictions of European bison became more common. Paleolithic Europeans also depicted bison in a variety of other mediums, such as carvings, though it is difficult to distinguish whether they are depicting European or steppe bison.

== Extinction ==
The distribution of the steppe bison substantially contracted at the end of the Pleistocene, becoming extinct in Western Europe during the terminal Pleistocene-early Holocene around 12-10,000 years ago, but survived in areas of Siberia, northwest North America and possibly European Russia into the early-mid Holocene. A bison skeleton, genetically confirmed to be steppe bison rather than American bison, found in the Versleuce Meadows near Whitehorse, Yukon in northwest Canada was radiocarbon dated to 5,578-5327 calibrated years Before Present (c. 3450 BCE). A 2015 study reported B. priscus remains in the northern Angara River in northern Siberia have been dated to 4500–4400 years BP, with this study also reporting a skull attributed to B. priscus found in sediments of the Oyat River in Leningrad Oblast, western Russia north of Moscow, had been radiocarbon dated (uncalibrated) to 3045 years BP. However, a later 2022 study did not consider fossil records of steppe bison later than about 8,700 years ago in Eurasia credible. Environmental DNA of the steppe bison in northeastern Siberia has been suggested to date to as late as 6,400 ± 600 years ago, but concerns have been raised about environmental DNA being reworked into younger sediments postdating its true age.

The steppe bison became extinct as part of the Late Quaternary extinction event, along with most other large mammal species globally, with humans hunting and/or climate change considered the likely causes, though the precise contributions of both factors remain controversial. A 2022 modelling study simulating the steppe bisons decline and extinction in Siberia estimated that the steppe bison became extinct in Siberia around 7,400 years ago. It found that the species was substantially affected by both climate change and human hunting, and suggested that steppe bison would have been able to persist in small refugia in the far north of Siberia if human hunting were absent.

== Discoveries ==
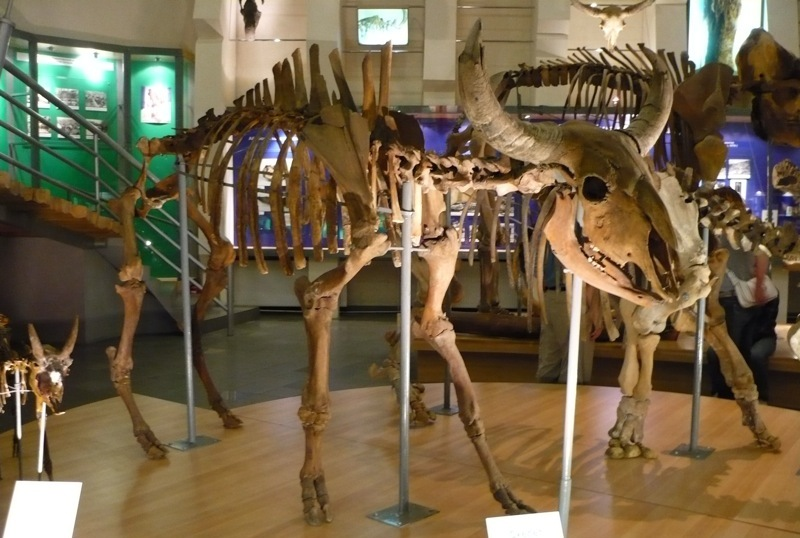
Bison priscus skeleton at the Mammoth Museum in the Canton of Zürich, Switzerland

Blue Babe is the 36,000-year-old mummy of a male steppe bison discovered north of Fairbanks, Alaska, in July 1979. A gold miner found the specimen and named it after Babe, the mythical blue ox of Paul Bunyan. The mummy's bluish coloration resulted from a coating of vivianite, a blue iron phosphate that covered much of its surface. Claw marks on its hindquarters and tooth punctures in its skin indicate that it was killed by a cave lion. Blue Babe appears to have died during the fall or winter, its carcass likely cooled rapidly and froze, limiting access for scavengers. The specimen is also known for an unusual episode during its preparation for permanent display at the University of Alaska Museum: members of the research team removed a portion of it's neck, stewed it and ate it to celebrate their work.

In early September 2007, local resident Shane Van Loon discovered a steppe bison carcass near Tsiigehtchic. Radiocarbon dating placed the remains at approximately 13,650 cal BP. It appears to represent the first known Pleistocene mummified soft tissue remains recovered from the glaciated regions of northern Canada.

In 2011, another steppe bison mummy, dating to around 9,300 years ago, was discovered at Yukagir in Siberia.

In 2016, a frozen bison tail was discovered in northern Sakha, Russia. Although its precise age was uncertain, tests indicated that it was at least 8,000 years old. A team of Russian and South Korean scientists proposed extracting DNA from the specimen with the aim of potentially cloning the animal in the future.

The steppe bison is also known from Denisova Cave, the site where the first Denisovan remains were discovered.
