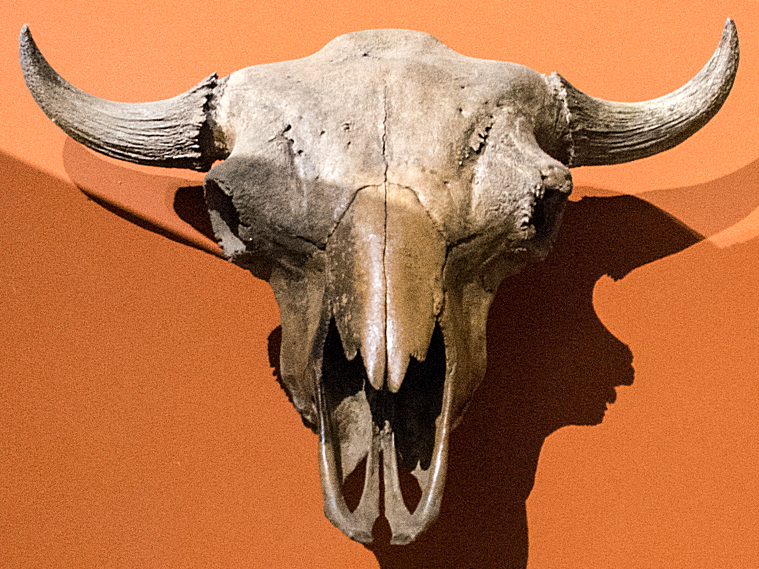
- Bison occidentalis skull at the Cleveland Museum of Natural History

Scientific classification
- Kingdom: Animalia
- Phylum: Chordata
- Class: Mammalia
- Infraclass: Placentalia
- Order: Artiodactyla
- Family: Bovidae
- Subfamily: Bovinae
- Genus: Bison
- Species: †B. occidentalis

Binomial name
- †Bison occidentalis Lucas, 1898

Synonyms
- Bison antiquus occidentalis; Bison bison occidentalis; Bison priscus occidentalis

= Bison occidentalis =

Bison occidentalis Temporal range: Late Pleistocene-Holocene (~13,000-1,730 years Before Present)

Extinct species of mammal

Bison occidentalis is an extinct species of bison that lived in North America, from about 13,000 to 1,730 years ago, spanning the end of the Pleistocene to the Holocene.

== Taxonomy ==
F. A. Lucas described Bison occidentalis based on a partial skull from Fort Yukon, Alaska in 1898. While Lucas first classified Bison occidentalis as a separate species, the most prevalent classification, Bison occidentalis has also sometimes been classified as a subspecies of either the steppe bison, the ancient bison, and the modern American bison.

=== Evolution ===
The ultimate ancestor of all American bison species, the steppe bison (Bison priscus), first entered northwest North America (Eastern Beringia, comprising Alaska and Yukon) around 195,000–135,000 years ago during the Penultimate Glacial Period (also known in North America as the Illinoian), and then entered central North America at the beginning of the Last Interglacial (regionally known as the Sangamonian) around 130,000 years ago, following the melting of the Laurentide Ice Sheet, with a B. priscus population evolving into long-horned bison (Bison latifrons) by 120,000 years ago, and subsequently a population of B. latifrons into Bison antiquus by 60,000 years ago in central North America. During the Last Glacial Period, steppe bison continued to inhabit Alaska and Yukon, separated from B. latifrons and B. antiquus by the reformed Laurentide Ice Sheet which formed an effective barrier to dispersal by 75,000 years ago, with genetic evidence indicating a second migration of steppe bison into Alaska and Yukon from Asia around 45-21,000 years ago.

Some authors consider Bison occidentalis to be an intermediate species between Bison antiquus and modern American bison (Bison bison), spanning from the Late Pleistocene-Early Holocene and including remains from central North America. However, as the type specimen of B. occidentalis is from Alaska, other authors have argued that the species should be restricted to remains from northwest North America (no further south than northern British Columbia), with suggestions that true B. occidentalis evolved locally in the region from steppe bison (Bison priscus) around 13,000 years ago. Due to this uncertainty, specimens that likely represent intermediates between B. antiquus and B. bison in central North America have been referred to as B. "occidentalis". Some authors have suggested that B. bison descends from hybridization between true B. occidentalis migrating into central North America from Alaska, following the remelting of the Laurentide Ice Sheet, and central North American B. antiquus, though this suggestion has been rejected by other authors who suggest that B. bison evolved from B. antiquus alone, due to a lack of genetic evidence of second migration steppe bison/B. occidentalis ancestry in modern American bison.

Some authors include remains found in continental Eurasia and the Japanese archipelago.

== Extinction ==
The youngest remains attributed to Bison occidentalis in Alaska date to approximately 1,730 years Before Present (~220 AD).

== See also ==
- Great bison belt
