= Great bison belt =

Grassland from Alaska to the Gulf of Mexico around 9000 BC

Original distribution of plains bison and wood bison in North America. Holocene bison (Bison occidentalis) is an earlier form at the origin of plains bison and wood bison. Holocene bison Wood bison Plains bison

The great bison belt is a tract of rich grassland that ran from Alaska to the Gulf of Mexico from around 9000 BC. The great bison belt was supported by spring and early summer rainfall that allowed short grasses to grow. These grasses retain their moisture at the roots which allowed for grazing ungulates such as bison to find high-quality nutritious food in autumn.

These grasses are what allowed the bison population to thrive, as they were able to receive all of their nutrients from the short grasses, unlike other Ice Age animals which expanded in the postglacial period. This area was important to the Plains Paleo-Indians, who around 8500 BC turned to bison hunting instead of hunting a broader range of food.

== Early history ==
About 50–75 million years ago, surging molten rock formed the mountain ranges of the west, including the Black Hills. About 10 million years ago, geological forces shaped the rest of the great bison belt, the largest terrestrial biome in North America. When the Pleistocene epoch ended about 10,000 years ago, warmer and drier weather came to dominate the region, making the biome ideal for grasslands and vegetation. Before human intervention, the great bison belt included most of the present-day United States as well as parts of Canada and Mexico. It stretched from Southern Mexico to Northern Canada, and from California to Virginia.

== Environment ==
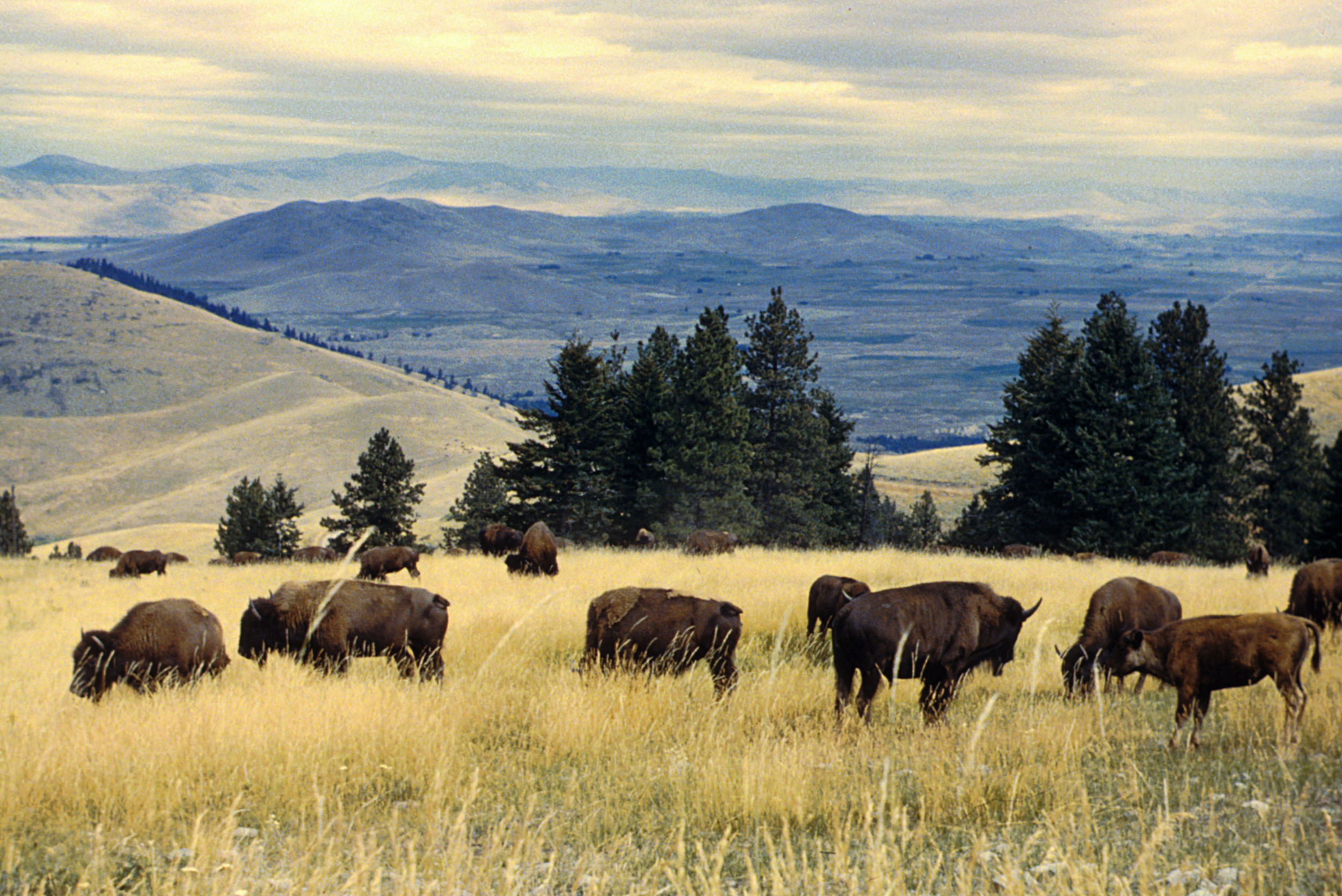
Bison herd grazing at the CSKT Bison Range

The environment of the great bison belt has been defined by low rainfall, typically less than 24 in (610 mm) per year. In drier areas, annual rainfall was less than 16 in (410 mm). The area has also been unstable and unpredictable. Periods of drought could quickly be replaced by excessive rainfall. There have been important regional differences to the environment. The southern plains, including the Texas Panhandle, often received greater winds and less precipitation than regions to the north, such as North and South Dakota. As a result, droughts have been more prevalent in the southern regions of the great bison belt. The droughts could be so severe that early explorers called it the Great American Desert. The Canadian prairies are similar to the grasslands of the American plains, although farmers deforested much of the region and converted grassland to farmland. The area from Northern Alberta to Alaska is mostly woodlands, and supported smaller groups of non-migratory wood bison.

The grasslands of the western plains were the core of the great bison belt. The grasslands consisted primarily of blue grama (Bouteloua gracilis) and buffalo grass (Bouteloua dactyloides). These grasses have deep and dense root structure and retain large amounts of water, making them well suited to survive dramatic environmental fluctuations. Volatility, not equilibrium, defined the natural environment of the great bison belt.

== Role of the bison ==
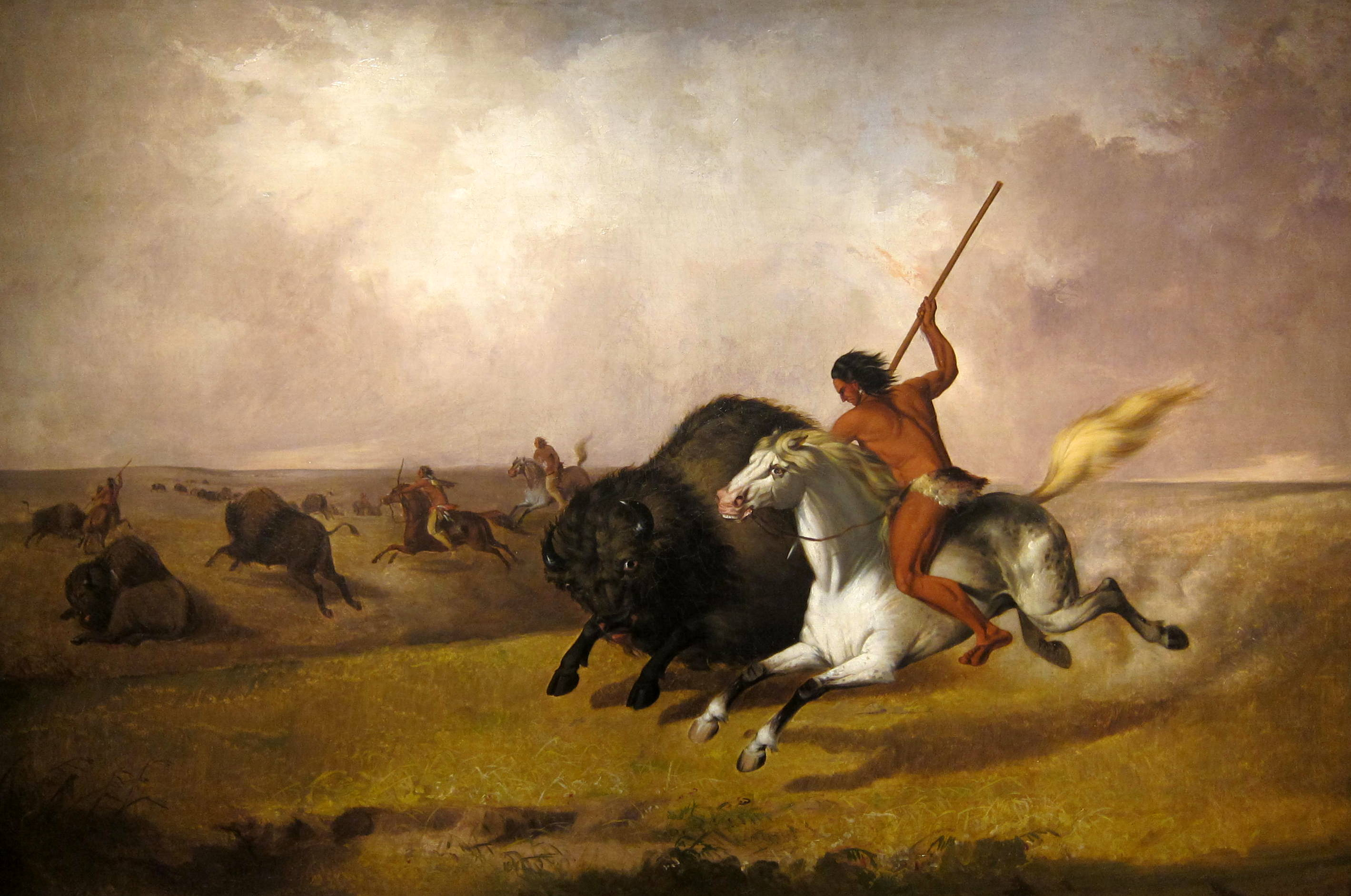
Buffalo Hunt on the Southwestern Prairies, 1845 by John Mix Stanley

The bison is the largest extant land animal in North America. It can weigh up to a ton, and once inhabited the entire length of the great bison belt. English colonists saw bison for the first time by the Potomac River.

At their peak, between thirty and forty million bison roamed the bison belt. Bison are excellent thermo-regulators, and successfully endured the harshest environmental conditions. The protein to carbohydrate ratio in the short grass provided an ideal diet for large numbers of bison. Humans had largely destroyed the megafauna of North America, eliminating the resource competition of bison. The droppings and grazing of the bison supported healthy grass maintenance, and prevented the intrusion of taller grasses. Additionally, fires which broke out in the grasslands would cause bison populations to rise. This is due to the regrowth of a recently burned area being rich in nutrients. The bison belt supported numerous species and complex ecosystems. For instance, the bison were so plentiful that by the early 19th century, it is estimated that about 1.5 million wolves lived on the bison belt, feeding largely on the bison.

== Human changes ==
For thousands of years, humans have altered the landscape and ecosystems of the great bison belt. They removed trees, introduced new plants, hunted animals, planted crops, and initiated controlled burns.

=== Pre-colonial effects ===
The most consequential way by which the Indigenous peoples of North America affected the ecology of the great bison belt was by expanding it through fire. By initiating controlled burns at regular intervals, Native Americans were able to expand shortgrass plains into formerly forested areas, and maintain them by preventing the regrowth of brush. Some European settlers documented such traditions as occurring annually, implying that they existed before European contact. One such writer, R. W. Wells, described the practice in detail.

"To remedy these and many other inconveniences, even the woods were originally burned so as to cause prairies, and for the same and like reasons they continue to be burned towards the close of the Indian summer.

Woodland is not commonly changed to prairie by one burning, but by several successive conflagrations; the first will kill the undergrowth, which causing a greater opening, and admitting the sun and air more freely, increases the quantity of grass the ensuing season: the conflagration consequently increases, and is not sufficiently powerful to destroy the smaller timber; and on the third year, you behold an open prairie.

Ordinarily, all the country, of a nature to become prairie, is already that state; yet the writer of this has seen, in the country between the Mississippi and Missouri, after unusual dry seasons, more than one hundred acres of woodland together converted into prairie."

Additionally, Native Americans also used fire for the hunting of bison. By initiating burns to cause regrowth which is rich in nutrients, they could artificially create ideal conditions for bison to graze in. Using this to lure bison to driveline complexes and jumps allowed for greater success when hunting bison. They also used fire in a more active way. By setting fires in a path, they were able to drive ruminants (such as bison and deer) towards hunters, allowing for easier kills.

=== Euro-colonial effects ===
Since the arrival of European settlers, many more significant human changes have taken place. The introduction of livestock from Europe completely altered the natural environment. Brought by the Spanish in the 1500s, horses were spread across the plains through complex trade networks. The horses were suited for the environment of the bison belt, and quickly proliferated. Plains Natives eagerly adopted them, using them to pursue the bison herds across the bison belt year-round. Some societies were radically altered, as they fully adopted a semi-nomadic lifestyle. By the early 19th century, about 60,000 Plains Natives owned between 300,000 and 900,000 horses. This was in addition to over two million wild horses. The horses put pressure on the bison in two ways. First, they competed with the bison for grazing, reducing the carrying capacity of the bison belt. Second, they enabled the Plains Natives to kill bison at a much greater rate than prior to the adoption of horses.

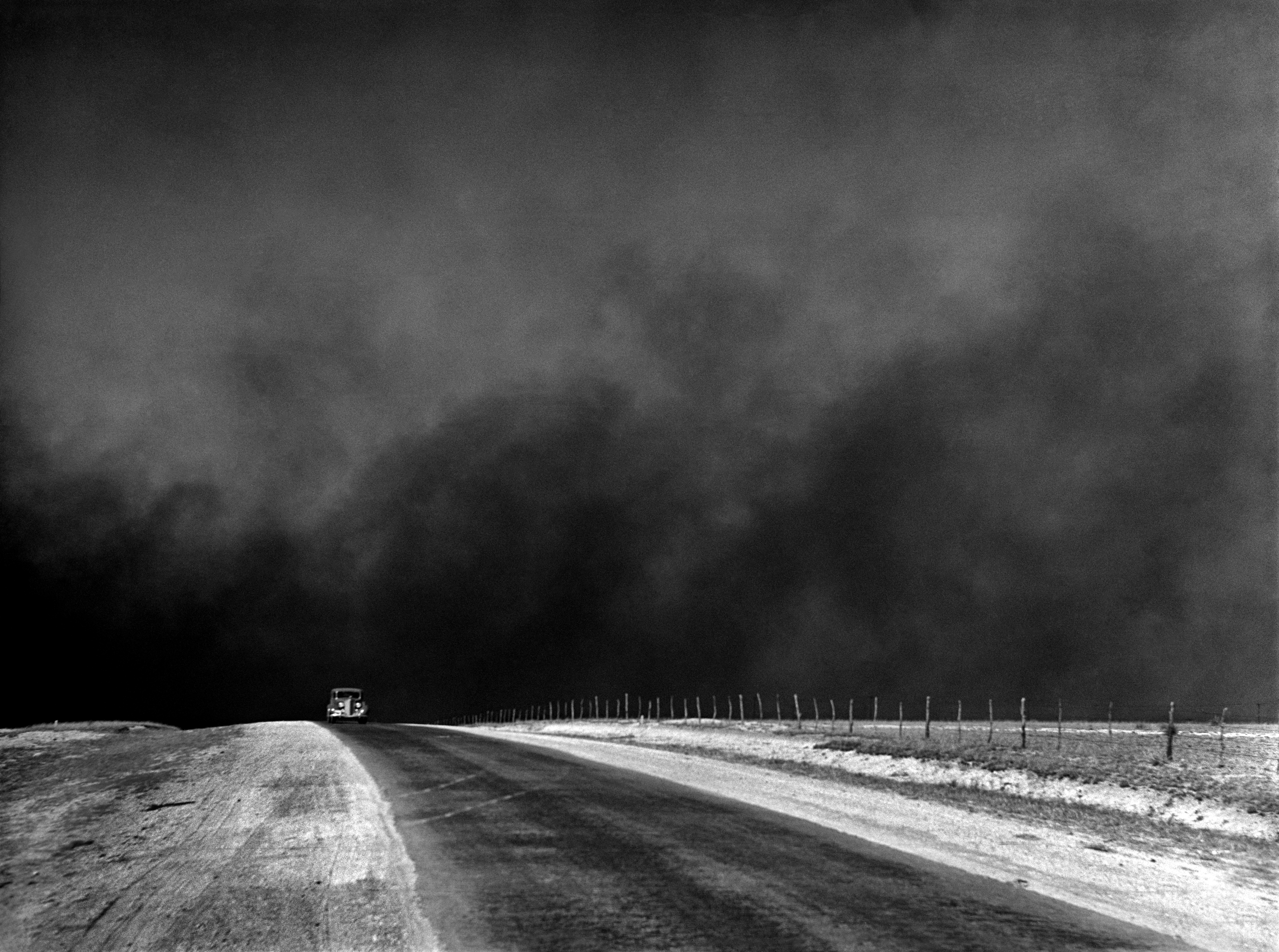
Dust bowl, Texas Panhandle

By the 1840s, the Plains Natives were killing the bison at a greater rate. They killed about 500,000 bison for subsistence, in addition to 100,000 for trade with American merchants to the east. At the same time, deforestation to the north and east combined with the growth of the cattle market to the south, placing even greater pressure on the bison. Finally, commercial hunters in the 1870s hunted the bison nearly to extinction. Between 1872 and 1874, hide hunters killed over four million bison, while the Plains Natives killed over one million.

The destruction of the bison had serious consequences for the ecosystems of the great bison belt. The resilient short grasses were dominated by the less stable but aggressive tall grasses. Cattle soon replaced the bison as the primary consumers of the grasslands. By 1900, about 30 million livestock subsisted on the bison belt. The cattle quickly overgrazed large sections of the bison belt. The situation was so severe that the amount of land required to maintain cattle increased tenfold. The cattle began a process of denuding the plains and altering the ecosystems of the west.

The final major change to the great bison belt was agriculture. The grasslands soon proved to be a hospitable area for growing wheat. Farmers and homesteaders removed the grass and sod to make room for farmland. This practice disrupted ecosystems, leading to an explosion in the populations of grasshoppers and other pests. The destruction of the grasslands was extensive. In the southern plains of the United States, three million acres of grassland was reduced to 450,000 acres of grassland by 1926. The destruction of the grasslands led to the Dust Bowl of the 1930s, one of the worst ecological disasters in history. By 1935, 850 million tons of topsoil had blown off. The dust was carried as far as the Atlantic Ocean. Since then, the bison belt has been supported by government soil conservation efforts, but the grasslands have never fully recovered. Additionally, some groups continue to initiate controlled burns, so as to maintain healthy grassland.

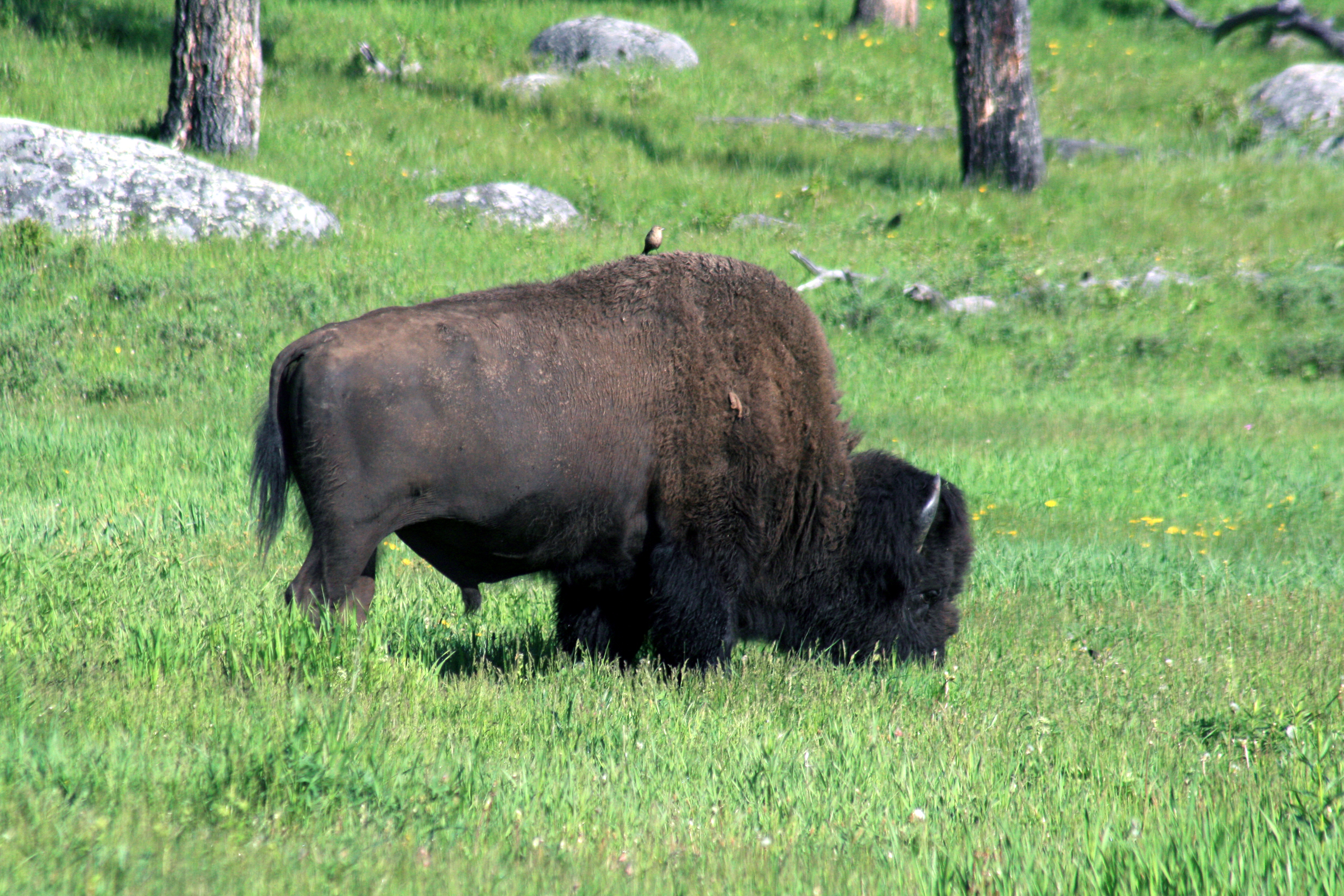
A Bison in Yellowstone

== Current status ==
The area that makes up the great bison belt continues to be a breadbasket for North America, with farmland to the east and cattle to the west. Bison have recovered slightly in Yellowstone National Park, where their numbers reached between two and four thousand by the 1990s. With the reintroduction of wolves, bison are once again part of a complex and healthy ecosystem.
