= Agate Basin Site =

Archaeological site in Wyoming, US

- U.S. National Register of Historic Places
- Nearest city: Mule Creek, Wyoming
- NRHP reference No.: 74002029
- Added to NRHP: February 15, 1974

The Agate Basin Site is a Paleoindian archeological site in Niobrara County, Wyoming. The location was discovered by William H. Spencer of Spencer, Wyoming in 1916, who found well-preserved stone blades and points in Moss Agate Arroyo. In 1941 Spencer mentioned the find to Robert E. Frison, a deputy game warden at Newcastle, who visited the site and contacted Dr. Frank H.H. Roberts of the Bureau of American Ethnology at the Smithsonian Institution. Roberts visited the site in 1942, but it would not be until 1959 that a full investigation began by the University of Wyoming on what proved to be a buffalo kill site. Further investigation took place under the direction of Dr. George C. Frison.

The site was listed on the National Register of Historic Places in 1974.
