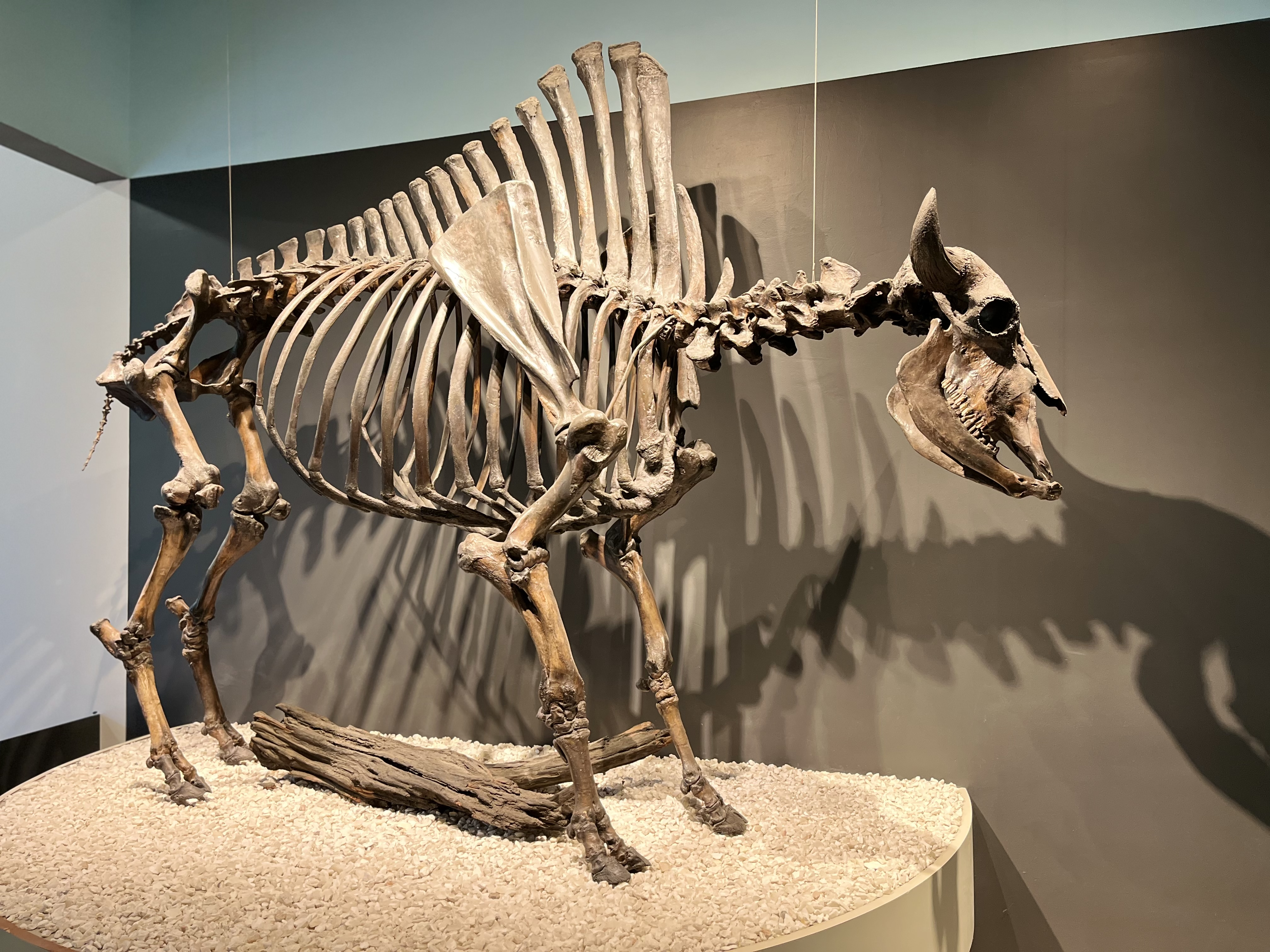
- Bison antiquus at the La Brea Tar Pits Museum

Scientific classification
- Kingdom: Animalia
- Phylum: Chordata
- Class: Mammalia
- Order: Artiodactyla
- Family: Bovidae
- Subfamily: Bovinae
- Genus: Bos
- Subgenus: Bison
- Species: †B. antiquus

Binomial name
- †Bison antiquus Leidy, 1852

Synonyms
- Bison californicus Rhoads, 1897

= Bison antiquus =

Bison antiquus Temporal range: Late Pleistocene–Early Holocene

Extinct species of mammal

Bison antiquus is an extinct species of bison that lived in North America during the Late Pleistocene and the beginning of the Holocene from over 60,000 years ago until around 10,000 years ago. Bison antiquus was one of the most common large herbivores in North America during this time period. It is the direct ancestor of the living American bison.

== Taxonomy and evolution ==
The first described remains of Bison antiquus were collected at Big Bone Lick, Kentucky in Pleistocene deposits in the 1850s and only consisted of a fragmentary posterior skull and a nearly complete horn core. The fossil (ANSP 12990) was briefly described by Joseph Leidy in 1852. Although the original fossils were fragmentary, a complete skull of an old male was discovered in southern California and were described as a new species, B. californicus, by Samuel Rhoads in 1897, but the species is considered synonymous with B. antiquus. Since the 19th century, several well preserved specimens of B. antiquus have been discovered in many parts of the United States, Canada, and southern Mexico.

=== Evolution ===
The steppe bison (Bison priscus), first entered northwest North America (Eastern Beringia, comprising Alaska and Yukon) around 195,000–135,000 years ago during the Penultimate Glacial Period (known in North American geology as the Illinoian), and then entered central North America at the beginning of the Last Interglacial (locally known in North America as the Sangamonian) around 130,000 years ago, following the melting of the Laurentide Ice Sheet, with a B. priscus population evolving into long-horned bison (Bison latifrons) by 120,000 years ago, and subsequently a population of B. latifrons into Bison antiquus by 60,000 years ago in central North America. B. antiquus became increasingly abundant in parts of midcontinent North America from 18,000 until about 10,000 years ago.

== Distribution ==
Bison antiquus is known from fossils found across North America south of the Laurentide Ice Sheet (whose southernmost extent is around the modern United States-Canada border), ranging from southern Canada (southern Alberta and Ontario) in the north, and Washington State and California in the west, southwards to Lake Nicaragua and eastwards to South Carolina and Florida.

== Description ==
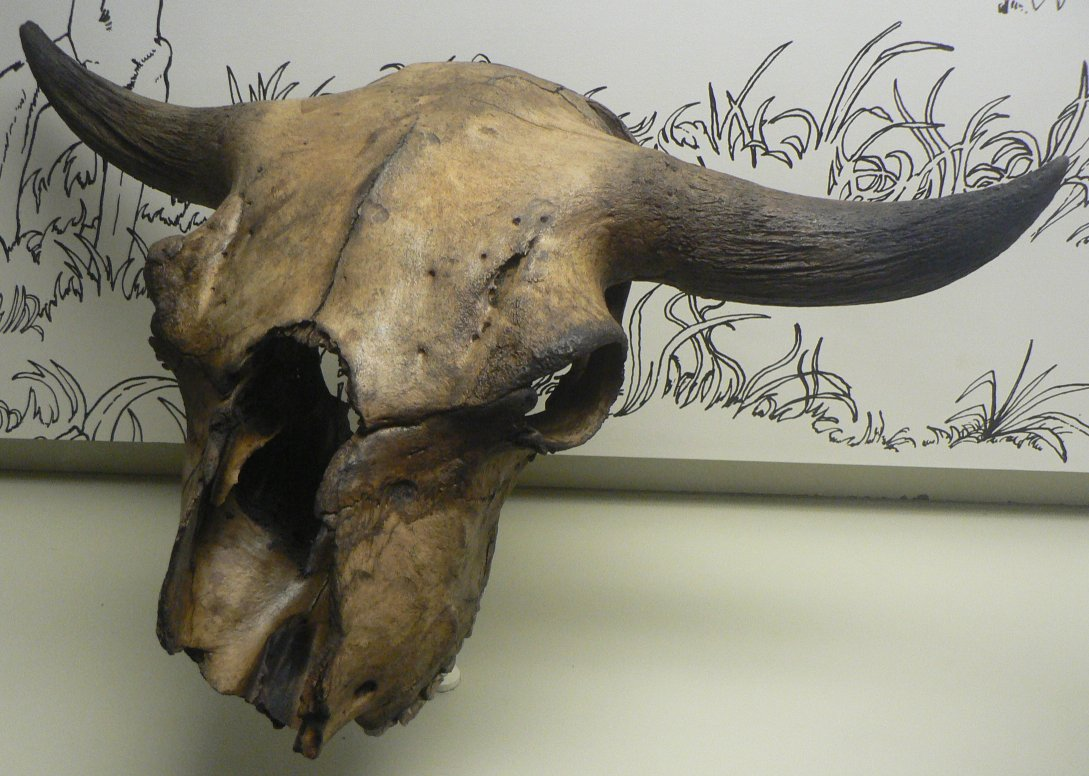
B. antiquus skull

Compared to the living American bison (Bison bison), B. antiquus was considerably larger and had longer limbs, with the upper limbs being more slender while the lower limbs were more robust. The skull was also somewhat more elongate and less domed than that of American bison. It reached up to 2.27 m (7.4 ft) tall, 4.6 m (15 ft) long, and a weight of 1,588 kg (3,501 lb), with an average of around 800 kg (1,800 lb). The horns were also considerably larger than those of living American bison and differed somewhat in shape, being on average 87 centimetres (2.85 ft) across tip to tip, but could be as much as 106.7 centimetres (3.50 ft) across.

== Ecology ==
B. antiquus was likely preyed upon by large carnivores, which may have included the American lion (Panthera atrox), the sabertooth cat Smilodon fatalis, and dire wolves (Aenocyon dirus).

=== Diet ===
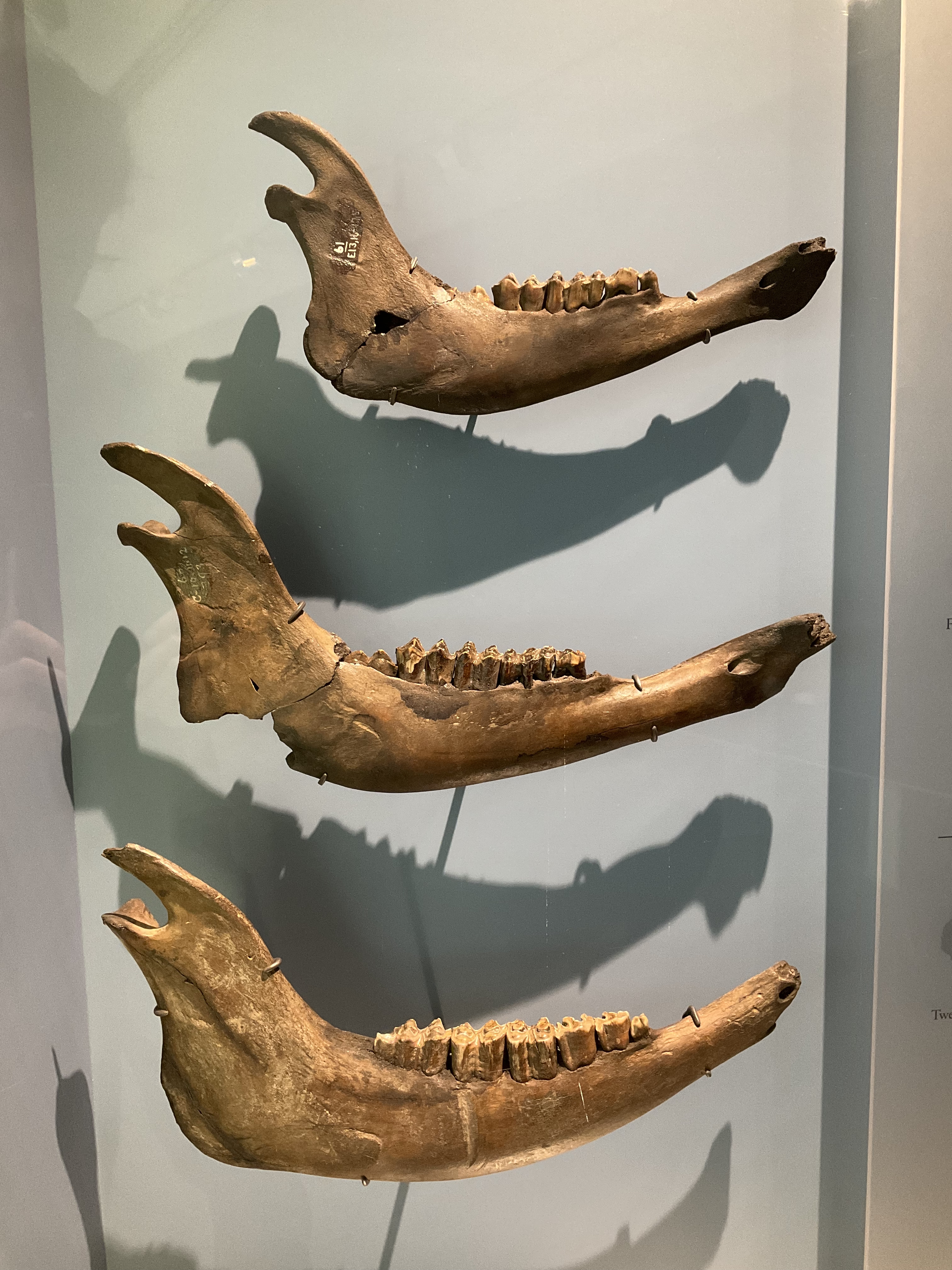
Mandible growth series: 2-4 month old (top), 14-16 month old (middle), 26-28 month old (bottom). From Rancho La Brea, California.

Unlike living American bison, which are almost exclusively grazers, dental wear analysis suggests that Bison antiquus was a variable mixed feeder (both browsing and grazing) with an adaptable diet depending on geographical location, with diets varying from strict grazing to mixed feeding. Paired dental mesowear and microwear from specimens of B. antiquus from the Southwestern United States dating back to the end of the Last Glacial Period, after the Last Glacial Maximum, has found that they competed with horses for resources and may have been one of the contributing factors in the extirpation of equids from the North American continent. Dental mesowear analysis of B. antiquus from Rancho La Brea has found that its diet remained stable and did not experience significant change over the terminal Pleistocene, suggesting it was minimally impacted by shifts in climate.

== Relationship with humans ==
A number of sites document the exploitation of Bison antiquus by Palaeoindian groups, such as those associated with the Clovis culture and the later Folsom tradition. The Folsom tradition in particular is thought to have been reliant on hunting bison.

One of the best educational sites to view in situ semifossilized skeletons of over 500 individuals of B. antiquus is the Hudson-Meng archeological site operated by the U.S. Forest Service, 18 mi (29 km) northwest of Crawford, Nebraska. A number of paleo-Indian spear and projectile points have been recovered in conjunction with the animal skeletons at the site, which is dated around 9,700 to 10,000 years ago. The reason for the "die-off" of so many animals in one compact location is still in conjecture; some professionals argue it was the result of a very successful paleo-Indian hunt, while others believe the herd died as a result of some dramatic natural event, to be later scavenged by humans. Individuals of B. antiquus of both sexes and a typical range of ages have been found at the site.

B. antiquus may have been hunted by Clovis people in North and South Carolina, based on blood residue from Clovis points. At Jake Bluff in northern Oklahoma, Clovis points are associated with numerous butchered Bison antiquus bones, which represented a bison herd of at least 22 individuals. At the time of deposition, the site was a steep-sided arroyo (dry watercourse) that formed a dead end, suggesting that hunters trapped the bison herd within the arroyo before killing them. Other arroyo trap sites include Cooper in northwest Oklahoma and Badger Hole also in Oklahoma, which are associated with Folsom points. B. antiquus remains exhibiting butchery marks have been found at Ayer Pond on Orcas Island in Washington State.

== Extinction ==
The living American bison (Bison bison) is suggested to have evolved from Bison antiquus in central North America at the very end of the Pleistocene. The last populations of B. antiquus became extinct during the early Holocene, around 10,000 years ago. Likely intermediates between the species are referred to as Bison "occidentalis".
