= Penultimate Glacial Period =

Glacial age that occurred before the Last Glacial Period

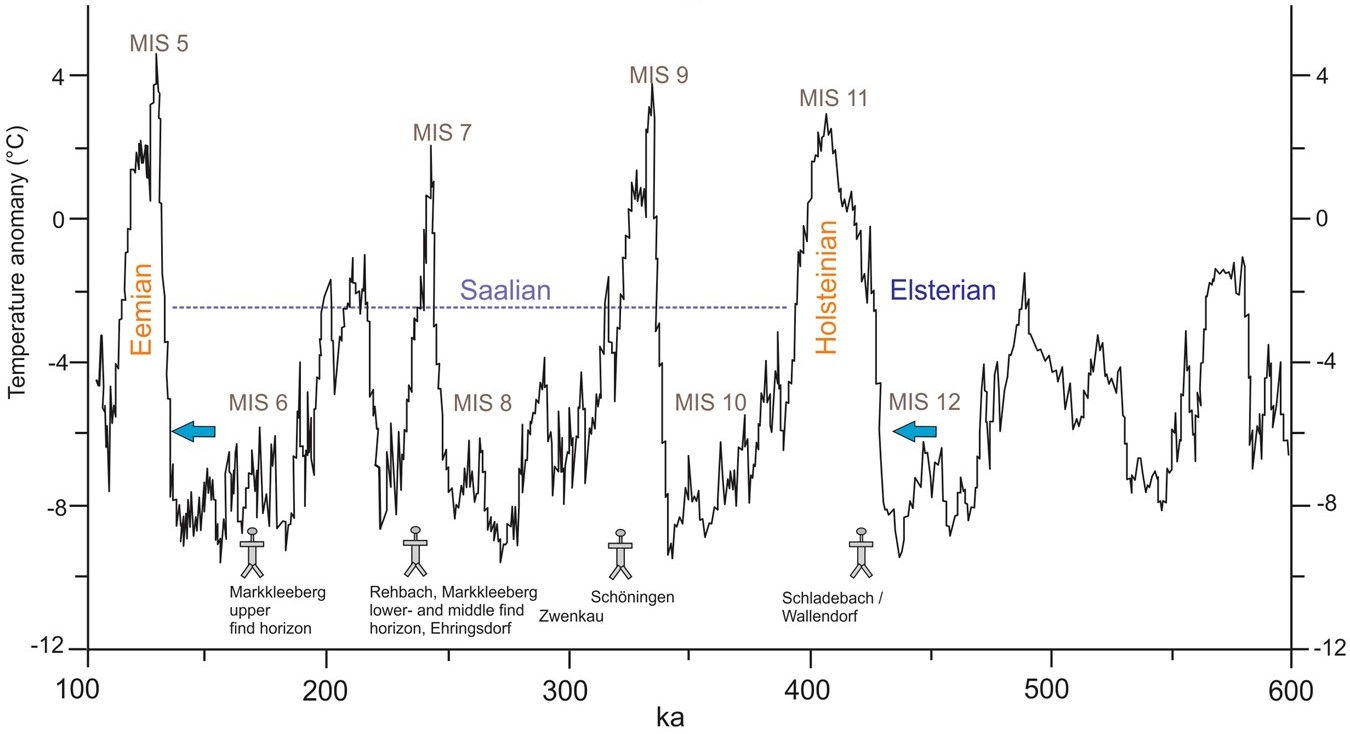
Diagram of glacial cycles, with the Penultimate Glacial Period labelled as MIS 6

The Penultimate Glacial Period (PGP) is the glacial period that occurred before the Last Glacial Period. The penultimate glacial period is officially unnamed just like the Last Glacial Period. The PGP lasted from ~194,000 years ago at the end of the Marine Isotope Stage 7 (MIS 7) interglacial, to ~135,000 years ago, and was succeeded by the Last Interglacial. The PGP approximately coincides with Marine Isotope Stage 6 (MIS 6). At the glacial ages' height, it is known to be the most extensive expansion of glaciers in the last 400,000 years over Eurasia, and could be the second or third coolest glacial period over the last 1,000,000 years, as shown by ice cores. Due to this, the global sea level dropped to between 92 and 150 metres below modern-day global mean sea level. The penultimate glacial period expanded ice sheets and shifted temperature zones worldwide, which had a variety of effects on the world's environment, and the organisms that lived in it. At its height, the penultimate glacial period was a more severe glaciation than the Last Glacial Maximum. The PGP covers the last period of the Saalian glaciation in Europe, called the Wolstonian Stage in Britain, and is equivalent to the Illinoian in North America.

== Cause ==
Much like the last glacial period, the penultimate glacial period was caused by a great orbital eccentricity of Earth. This eccentricity causes greater seasonal impacts than normal because it limits the amount of sunlight that reaches the earth's surface, lowering the temperature. Due to this, northern insolation (the amount of sunlight that reaches the surface) is reduced, meaning that during summer, less heat is exposed to the snows of the winter, which don't completely melt. This buildup of ice and snow over thousands of years eventually leads to residual ice sheets, which would also reflect light away from the earth, further cooling the earth. A decrease in greenhouse gas concentrations such as CO_{2}, are a result of the expanded ice sheets. This is because as the Earth cooled, and ice sheets expanded, the ocean waters became colder, which then could absorb more CO_{2} from the atmosphere. These factors all feedback into each other: as the ice sheets extended, more light was reflected off the ice sheets, reducing temperatures, cooling the oceans which then absorbed more CO_{2}, which led to more cooling and further expanded the ice sheets, this self-reinforcing cooling setting the world into a glacial period.

== Effects ==
The Penultimate Glacial Maximum around 140,000 years ago was the most extensive glaciation in Eurasia in the last 400,000 years. It was colder in high latitudes and warmer in the tropics than the Last Glacial Maximum.

=== Europe ===
In northern Europe, the biggest expansion of glaciation of the last 400,000 years covered the northern region in a thick ice sheet, which caused a drastic reduction of vegetation. In the Mediterranean, polar winds from the now extended ice sheets brought cooler and wetter conditions that caused a significant reduction in large vegetation such as trees. Pollen sequences found from MIS 6 indicated that early in the glacial period, tree abundance fluctuated heavily.

Later in the glacial period, extreme conditions were followed by a mainly treeless landscape all across Europe. This rendered Europe a polar desert just south of the now expanded ice sheets, and the rest of Europe was left with a sporadic herb based plant cover. Europe north of the Alps was a tundra-steppe of predominantly grasses, sedges, and chenopods, while land south of the Alps featured discontinuous steppe vegetation patterns. There were some refugia in the sheltered areas of the mountainous Alps and the western Balkans where tree populations survived. This was due to temperature variations not being extreme in these locations, as well as precipitation still being sufficient. This is unlike the rest of Europe, such as in France where pollen samples revealed a precipitation decrease of almost 60% compared to the modern day. The drastic changes in the climate also resulted in increased storms in the North Atlantic, affecting Europe as well as North America.

=== Asia ===
Isotope dating was conducted in Hulu Cave, eastern China, and found that the penultimate glacial period's presence was felt in central China. The dating showed an increased presence of oxygen-18, an isotope that reflects the meteoric water and cave temperature, as well as precipitation of the penultimate glacial period. This data led to the confirmation of intense monsoons that impacted most of south-east Asia, and up to modern day Xi'an China. The increase in the intensity of monsoons was due to the orbital shifting of the planet, but was amplified by the ice sheets that formed for the same reason. These factors combined then affected the atmospheric hydrological cycle, creating more intense seasonal winds that led to increased precipitation over south-east Asia.

=== North America ===
In contrast to Europe, there is no geological evidence to support a similarly sized ice sheet in North America. Ice-rafted debris from the Hudson area indicates that during MIS6, there were far fewer icebergs in the North Atlantic than in the last glacial period. Simulations testing the extent of an ice sheet in North America have shown that a smaller ice sheet is probable, as the simulation produced weather data that is consistent with hypothesized temperatures at the time. This simulation showed the precipitation rates over North America doubled during MIS6, which would have been a result of the icy winds expanding southward further into the continent, as well as the increased storms.

A 2019 study suggested that the Penultimate Glacial Period was warmer in North America than the Last Glacial Period.

=== South America ===
In South America, the intensity of the South American Summer Monsoon (SASM) varied with a cyclical periodicity of about 3,500 years, with gradual increases in the SASM's strength being punctuated by sudden decreases. These sudden decreases are thought to be related to Dansgaard-Oeschger events.

=== Africa ===
Oceanic cores, taken from western Africa, show the deserts expanded, pushing the savannah and the tropical rainforests downward, and oak trees occupying the Mediterranean coast, disappeared. This is thought to have occurred due to southward migration of the subtropical, and high pressure zone of the Mediterranean.

The time interval during which the PGP took place coincided with numerous important phases of hominin evolution in Africa, including the evolution of Homo sapiens, the transition from the Acheulean to the Middle Palaeolithic, and other critical cultural and behavioural innovations. Several studies have suggested that H. sapiens went through a genetic bottleneck during the Penultimate Glacial Period which reduced numbers to a low level, but a 2012 analysis of three modern African populations finds no evidence for a bottleneck at this time. The dislocation of vegetation during the PGP was thought to have displaced H. sapiens, although studies have shown that the region which the early humans occupied was very lightly disturbed, and a bottleneck due to the Penultimate Glacial Period is thus unlikely to have occurred.

=== Antarctica ===
The Antarctic Zone expanded northwards until encompassing the northern Kerguelen Plateau, as evidenced by the maximum abundance of the radiolarians Dictyophimus bicornis, Pseudodictyophimus gracilipes, and P. platycephalus during this glacial.
