= University of Colorado Museum of Natural History =

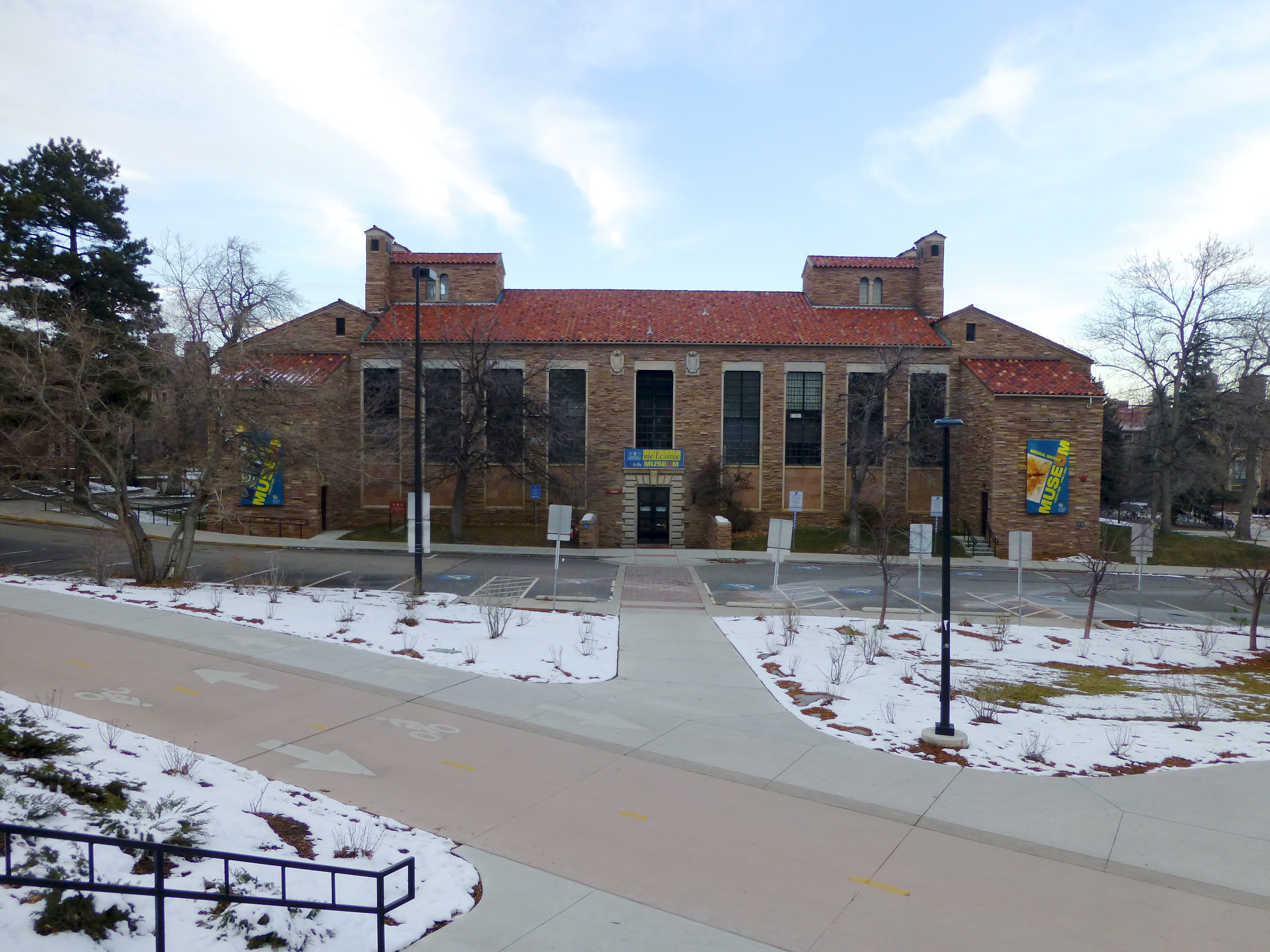
- The museum's public exhibits are housed in the Henderson Building on the University of Colorado at Boulder campus.
- Established: 1902
- Location: 15th and Broadway; Boulder, Colorado (United States)
- Coordinates: 40.0069°N 105.2728°W
- Type: Natural history museum
- Owner: University of Colorado
- Website: www.colorado.edu/cumuseum

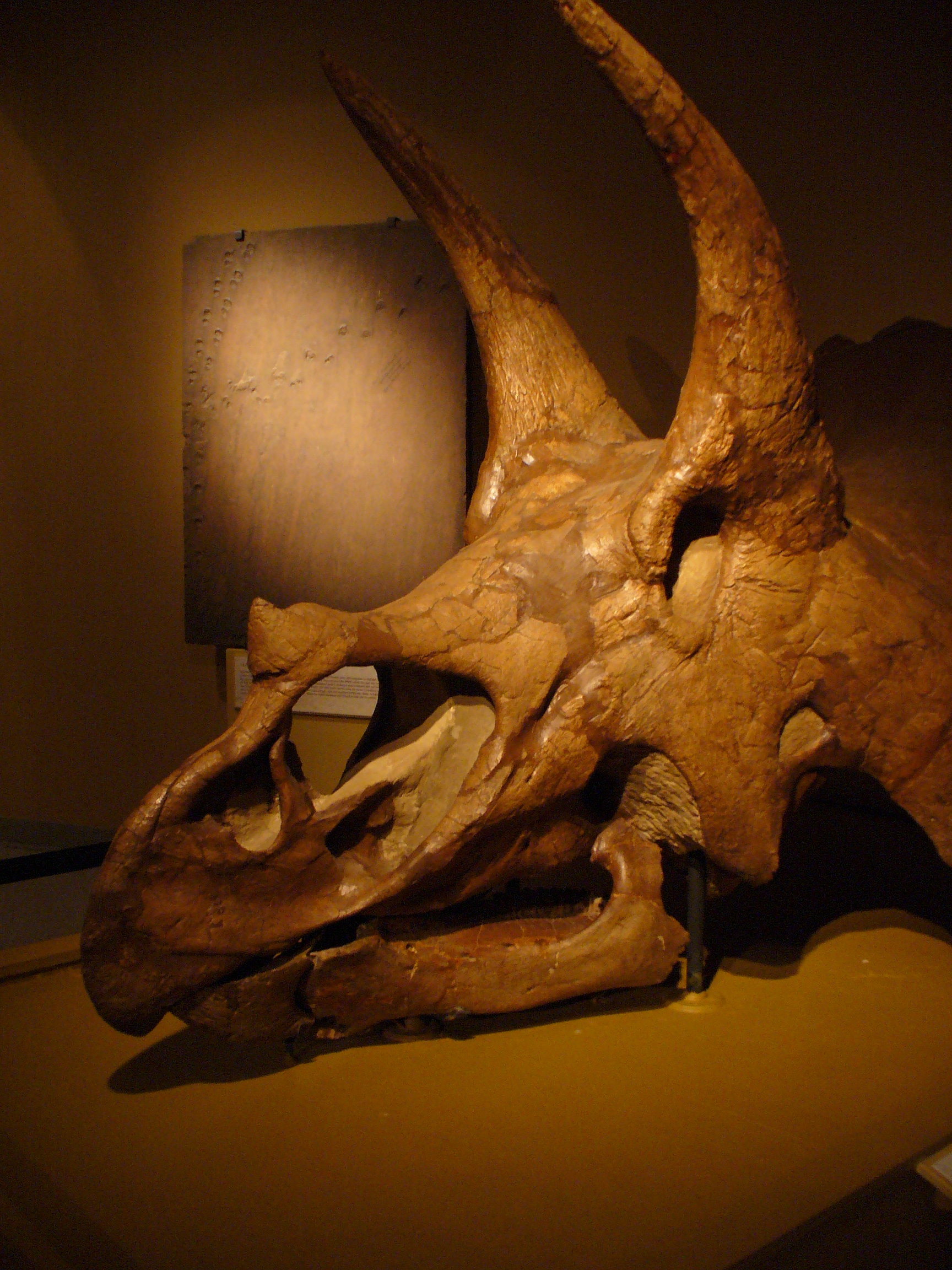
A triceratops skull in the Paleo Hall at the museum.

The University of Colorado Museum of Natural History is a museum of natural history in Boulder, Colorado. With more than five million artifacts and specimens in the areas of anthropology, botany, entomology, paleontology and zoology, the museum houses the most extensive natural history collection in the Rocky Mountain region. In 2003, the University of Colorado Museum received accreditation by the American Alliance of Museums.

The museum was founded in 1902, when Judge Junius Henderson was appointed its first curator. It was originally named the University of Colorado Museum. It is housed on the University of Colorado Boulder campus in the Henderson Building. The museum is open Tuesday through Saturday from 10:00 a.m. to 4:00 p.m., with extended hours on Thursday from 10:00 a.m. to 7:00 p.m.
