= Folsom point =

Stone projectile points once used in ancient North America

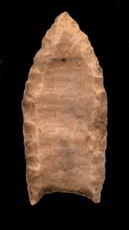
A Folsom projectile point

Folsom points are projectile points associated with the Folsom tradition of North America. The style of tool-making was named after the Folsom site located in Folsom, New Mexico, where the first sample was found in 1908 by George McJunkin within the bone structure of an extinct bison, Bison antiquus, an animal hunted by the Folsom people. The Folsom point was identified as a unique style of projectile point in 1928, after being found in place August 29, 1927. The Folsom point found in association with the extinct bison bones proved to the scientific community that humans had lived in the Americas thousands of years longer than many had previously believed.

== Description ==
The points are bifacially worked and have a symmetrical, leaf-like shape with a concave base and wide, shallow grooves running almost the entire length of the point. The edges are finely worked. The characteristic groove, known as fluting, may have served to aid hafting to a wooden shaft or dart. Use-wear studies have shown that some examples were used as knives as well as projectile points. The fluting required great technical ability to effect, and it took archaeologists many years of experimentation to replicate it. This point is thought to be the pinnacle of the fluting technology. The flute was made by creating a nipple platform at the center of the base. The remnants of the nipple may be present on completed examples.

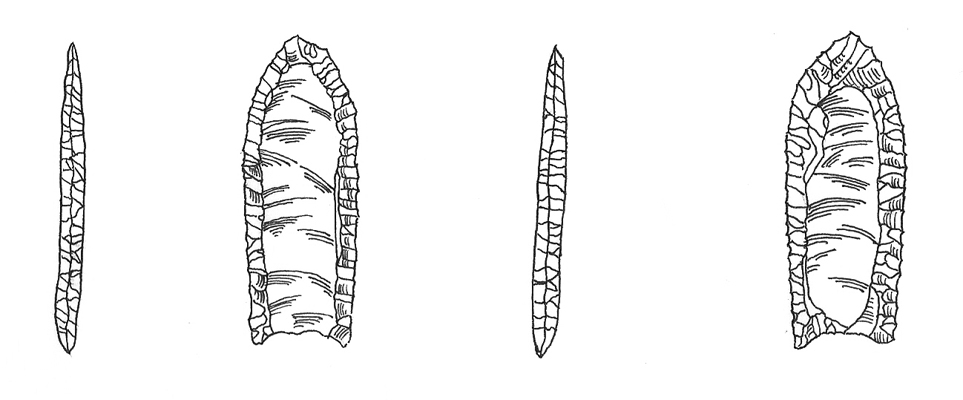
Folsom Point from Blackwater Draw, New Mexico

Compared to Clovis points, Folsom points are usually shorter and thinner, and the central groove is much longer, often extending more than half the length of the blade.

== Age and cultural affiliations ==
Folsom points are found widely across North America and are dated to the period between 11000 BCE and 10000 BCE in calibrated radiocarbon years. (Older radiocarbon readings date the Folsom sites at 9,000 to 8,000 BCE.) The discovery of these artifacts in the early 20th century raised questions about when the first humans arrived in North America. The prevailing idea of a time depth of about 3,000 years was clearly mistaken.

In 1932, an even earlier style of projectile point was found, Clovis, dating back to 11,500 BCE. Clovis points have been found in situ in association with mammoth skeletons.

In the Great Plains area, the use of Folsom points was supplanted over time by Plano points of the various Plano cultures.

== See also ==
- Folsom tradition
- Cascade point
- Clovis point
- Plano point
- Eden point
- Cumberland point
- Levanna projectile point
- Jack's Reef pentagonal projectile point
- Lamoka projectile point
- Susquehanna broad projectile point
- Bare Island projectile point
- Greene projectile point
