= List of North American projectile point types =

This is a list of notable documented styles of projectile points (arrowheads, bird points, spearheads, knives) produced by ancient North Americans and described by archaeologists.

- Agate basin point
- Angostura point
- Cahokia point, aka Grant side-notched point
- Clovis point
- Cumberland point
- Dalton point, aka Quad point
- Durst stemmed point
- Eastern fluted point, aka Gainey point
- Eden point
- Folsom point
- Frederick point, aka Allen point or Brown's Valley point
- Guilford lanceolate point
- Hardaway point
- Halifax side-notched points
- Hardin barbed point
- Hell Gap point
- Hi-Lo point, aka Price stemmed point or Chesro point
- Honey Creek corner-notched point
- Kessell side-notched point
- Kirk corner-notched point
- Kramer point
- Mack point
- Madison triangular point
- Matanzas point
- Morrow Mountain stemmed points
- Palmer corner-notched point
- Plainview point
- Preston corner-notched point
- Raddatz side-notched point, aka Osceola point
- Redstone point
- Savannah River point
- Scottsbluff point
- Snyders corner-notched point, aka Manker corner-notched point
- St. Charles point
- Stanley stemmed point
- Steuben expanded stemmed point, aka McCoy corner-notched point or Monona stemmed point
- Thebes point
- Waubesa contracting stem, aka Dickson broad blade
