= Plainview point =

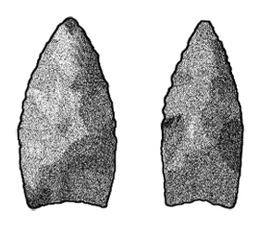
Plainview points

In the classification of Archaeological cultures of North America, the term Plainview points refer to Paleoindian projectile points dated between 10,000 and 9,000 Before Present. The point was named in 1947 after the discovery of a large cache of unfluted, lanceolate spear tips with concave bases that were found in a Bison antiquus kill site along the Running Water Draw river, near the town of Plainview in Texas, United States. The point is found primarily throughout the South Plains, however, this range may sometimes be misidentified, as "Plainview" was previously used as a general term to describe unfluted lanceolate points throughout the entirety of the Plains, as well as the eastern Upper Mississippi Valley.

== Classification ==
The classification of the Plainview point was made in 1947 by Glen Evans, G. E. Meade and E. H. Sellards for a cache of unfluted, lanceolate spear tips with concave bases found at an archaeological site along the Running Water Draw river near the town of Plainview in Texas. At least twenty-eight specimens were recovered from this location, which was the site of a Bison antiquus kill. Plainview was previously used as a general term to describe unfluted lanceolate points throughout the entirety of the Plains as well as the eastern Upper Mississippi Valley whereby points were classified as Plainview sub types. However this approach was later rejected and revised leading to new projectile point classifications. The Golondrina point (formally Plainview Golondrina) was one of these types mistakenly named as Plainview.

== Description ==
Plainview is described as having parallel or convex sides with a concave base. It is considered to be a Plano point.

== Comparison with other projectile points ==
Plainview is stylistically and morphologically similar to the Goshen point, although these types are primarily concentrated in the northern Plains and may precede Plainview by almost a thousand years.

== Plainview complex ==
Plainview complex, distinguished by the Plainview point, is similar to the Goshen complex. Due to the diversity of points found at the type site in Plainview, Texas, the complex has been widely interpreted, and may be grouped with Agate Basin, Firstview, Golondrina, and Milnesand points. Plainview kill and butchering sites are found in New Mexico, Nebraska, Oklahoma, and Texas.
