= Golondrina =

Golondrina (Spanish for 'Swallow') may refer to:

- Golondrina point, a Paleo-Indian projectile point
- Golondrina, Brownies section in the Association of Guides and Scouts of Chile
- Golondrina (manga), a 2011 Japanese manga series by Est Em
- Golondrina (yacht), a former Argentine war vessel
- "La golondrina", a 1862 Mexican song by Mexican composer Narciso Serradell Sevilla, which has become an anthem for Mexican expats
- "Ojitos de golondrina", a 1991 song by Mexican singer and composer Joan Sebastian
- Cuproxena golondrina, a species of moth of the family Tortricidae
- Orthocomotis golondrina, a species of moth of the family Tortricidae
- Golondrina mine, a copper mine in northernmost Chile

== See also ==
- Golondrinas (disambiguation)
