= Golondrina point =

Spear or projectile points from 9000 to 7000 BP

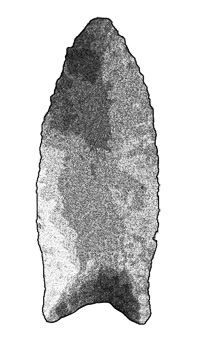
A Golondrina projectile point with a mildly serrated edge

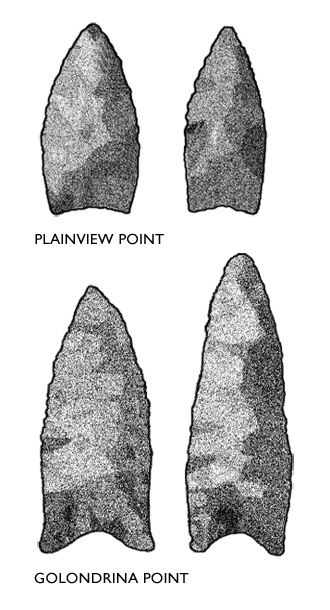
Comparison of Golondrina and Plainview points. Both styles date to Late Paleoindian times and share similar lanceolate shapes.

Golondrina points (formerly Plainview Golondrina) are lanceolate spear or dart projectile points, of medium size, dated to the transitional Paleo-Indian Period, between 9000 and 7000 BP. Golondrina points were attached on split-stem hafts and may have served to bring down medium-sized animals such as deer, as well as functioning as butchering knives. Distribution is widespread throughout most of Texas, and points have also been discovered in Arkansas and Mexico. The concentration of Golondrina specimens is highest across the South Texas Plains, where the point is the most prevalent of Paleo-Indian types and defines a distinctive cultural pattern for the region. The Golondrina point is so named for its flared basal corners ("ears"), which resemble a swallow's (golondrina in Spanish) split tail. Classification of Golondrina can be difficult because of its similarity to other types, particularly the Plainview point, to which it was originally thought to be related.

== Classification ==
Classification of the Golondrina point was made by Texas Historical Commission archeologist LeRoy Johnson Jr. in 1964, after the discovery of a collection of unrecognized projectile points at the Devil's Mouth site in the Amistad Reservoir, Texas. Initially believed to be related to the Plainview point classification, the new type was termed "Plainview Golondrina" by Johnson, who used a genus-species approach for the naming. This classification method sought to describe the relationship between the two types, placing Plainview as the genus, and Golondrina as the species, to highlight key similarities and differences. But by 1977, the genus-species classification approach had been discarded, and the name Golondrina alone was being used to represent the Devil's Mouth specimens. Subsequent research and technological analysis determined this type to be separate and distinct from the Plainsview point, and the name was shortened to simply "Golondrina" by Thomas C. Kelly in 1982. The type takes its name from a pronounced flaring of the basal corners (stem), which recall the split tail of a swallow (golondrina in Spanish). The Golondrina is considered to be a Plano point.

== Description ==
The Golondrina point is medium-sized and lanceolate-shaped with a lenticular cross-section that exhibits convex sides. The type displays a distinctive auriculate ("eared") stem with basal corners that flare outward. The blade edges are slightly serrated with a recurved outline—wide at the bottom, then narrowing before becoming wide and then thin again at the distal end, a so-called "fish shaped profile". The flaking style is generally random, with no attention given to alignment of flake scars. However, collateral flaking—where parallel flakes have been removed equally, resulting in a median ridge on the blade edges—has also been observed in some specimens. The basal edge of the Golondrina presents concave with a deep basal notch that varies from a flattened, inverted, v-shape to recurved. The Golondrina point can range in length from 32 to 61 mm, with a width ranging from 23 to 32 mm and a thickness from 6–8 mm. The width of the base ranges from 22 to 29 mm with a typical basal concavity of 4 mm or more. The Golondrina is unfluted, without a longitudinal channel flake.

The point has an expanding hafting area where the width, upward from the stem, increases in size. Analysis suggests that Golondrina points were attached on split-stem hafts either with or without foreshafts. They may have served a dual function as projectile points as well as butchering knives. By nature of a split-stem haft style, Golondrina points would not need to be deeply set, resulting in a largely exposed cutting edge. The hafting area, as well as the side and basal edges are usually ground dull.

Edwards chert, Alibates agate, and Tecovas jasper were the major materials utilized by Paleo-Indians in the Southern Plains for the manufacture of flaked stone implements. Chert was the most important stone for tool making throughout pre-historic central Texas and there were many available sites where it was acquired and knapped.

== Age and cultural affiliations ==
Most Golondrina points have been dated to the Transitional Paleo-Indian Period, between 9000 and 7000 BP, with excavation of stratified sites along with radiocarbon dating providing a definitive age. The first dating of Golondrina points was made after excavations of area C in the Devil's Mouth site which revealed Paleo-Indian projectile points that were radiocarbon assayed to 8700 BP. Later excavations in 1976, at the nearby Baker Cave in Texas, revealed a large hearth in the Golondrina stratum containing a wide variety of small game and plant remains left by early hunter gathers. This archaeological assemblage was termed Golondrina Complex, and the materials were attributed to the post-Pleistocene period. At the same site, Golondrina materials stratified near the base of a rock-shelter deposit were radiocarbon dated at 9000 BP

Projectile points featuring more Archaic characteristics, including early barbed and early stemmed, share an overlapping chronology with Golondrina.

== Distribution ==
Golondrina points are widespread across much of central, southern, and western Texas, with distribution extending northward along the Balcones Escarpment. They are particularly prevalent across the South Texas Plains, so much so as to be said to represent the first unique cultural pattern in the area. Most Golondrina specimens from the South Texas Plains are not excavated but rather found on the site's surface. They often appear as part of mixed collections with artifacts of later periods. Several sites have also been found in Arkansas as well as in the Lower Pecos Canyonlands and the Mexican states of Tamaulipas and Nuevo León.

== Comparison with other projectile points ==
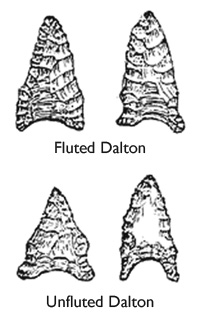
Dalton points display a similar auriculated stem as the Golondrina which can lead to confusion between the two types. Dalton blade edges, however, are characteristically more serrated.

The Golondrina can be difficult to type because of its similarity to other point classifications. In particular the distinction between Golondrina and Plainview is not yet completely resolved.

=== Plainview ===
Past hypotheses have suggested mistakenly that the Golondrina was a descendant or variant of the Plainview type. Although the two points exhibit similarities, particularly in terms of shape, they are now recognized as separate types. Identification is made from a lack of an auriculated, fishtail base on the Plainview and a deeper basal concavity on the Golondrina. Plainview points may have served to bring down large bison, while Golondrina points may have been used for killing smaller game such as deer, as well as doubling as a butchering knife. Compared to the split-stem hafting style of the Golondrina point without a deep setting, the shape of the Plainview points would necessitate them being set relatively deeply into a socketed haft that once bound would leave less of the cutting edge exposed. Stratigraphic evidence from the St. Mary's Hall site in southern, central Texas implies that Golondrina may have superseded Plainview on the southern Plains.

=== Others ===
The Simpson and Suwannee points, found in Florida and the Southeastern United States, are similar to the Golondrina in shape and age. The Dalton point, found in the central United States, shares a similar outline and basal corner auriculation with Golondrina, which may imply that they are part of a series. Identification is made by examination of the blade edges—Golondrina exhibits much less serration. The Meserve type has also been known to cause confusion, as it is considered a resharpened variant of the Plainview and Golondrina types.
