= Golondrinas =

Golondrinas (Spanish for 'Swallows') may refer to:

== Places ==
=== Argentina ===
- Las Golondrinas, a settlement in Brandsen Partido, Buenos Aires Province
- Las Golondrinas, a settlement in Cushamen Department, Chubut Province
- Puerto Golondrina, a suburb of the city of Ushuaia

=== Ecuador ===
- Las Golondrinas, a former province

=== Mexico ===
- Cave of Swallows (Sótano de las Golondrinas, a cave in San Luis Potosí

=== Puerto Rico ===
- Las Golondrinas Cavern, a cave and place of interest in Ciales municipality
- La Pocita de las Golondrinas Beach, in Isabela
- San Germán, Puerto Rico, the second oldest city of Puerto Rico, nicknamed Ciudad de las Golondrinas

=== Spain ===
- Golondrinas, a neighborhood in the Macarena district of Seville

=== United States ===
- Golondrinas, New Mexico, a village in Mora County, New Mexico
- El Rancho de las Golondrinas, an historic ranch in Santa Fe County, New Mexico

== Music ==
- Dos golondrinas, an orchestral piece by Venezuelan composer Aldemaro Romero, see El Garrasí
- "Las golondrinas", a song by Argentine singer Jorge Cafrune on the Uruguayan version of his fourth album Cafrune and on his fifth, Jorge Cafrune
- Las golondrinas (zarzuela), a zarzuela by Basque composer José María Usandizaga

== See also ==
- Golondrina (disambiguation)
