= Carl Richardson =

American football coach (1921–2023)

Biographical details
- Born: July 15, 1921; Running Water Draw, New Mexico, U.S.
- Died: August 16, 2023 (aged 102); Portales, New Mexico, U.S.

Coaching career (HC unless noted)
- 1954–1963: Eastern New Mexico

Head coaching record
- Overall: 57–37–3

Carl Calvin Richardson (July 15, 1921 – August 16, 2023) was an American college football coach. He served as the sixth head coach for Eastern New Mexico University in Portales, New Mexico and held that position for ten seasons, from 1954 until 1963. His overall coaching record at Eastern NMU was 57 wins, 37 losses, and 3 ties. This ranks him third at Eastern NMU in terms of total wins and fifth at Eastern NMU in terms of winning percentage.

Richardson was born in Running Water Draw, near Clovis, New Mexico, on July 15, 1921. He attended Portales High School and Eastern New Mexico University, where he played football. Named head coach of Eastern New Mexico in 1954, the team completed an undefeated season under Richardson in 1957. The 44-member squad finished with a record of 9–0–1, the one tie resulting from a 14-14 match with Southwestern Oklahoma.

In 1987, Richardson was inducted into the Eastern New Mexico University Greyhounds Hall of Fame. At the time, Richardson was residing in Portales, New Mexico. He retired in 1989. Richardson died in Portales on August 16, 2023, at the age of 102.

== Head coaching record ==
| Year | Team | Overall | Conference | Standing | Bowl/playoffs |
|---|---|---|---|---|---|
Eastern New Mexico Greyhounds (Texas Conference) (1954–1955)
| 1954 | Eastern New Mexico | 6–3 | 0–2 | 3rd | |
| 1955 | Eastern New Mexico | 5–4 | 0–2 | 3rd | |
Eastern New Mexico Greyhounds (NAIA independent) (1956–1963)
| 1956 | Eastern New Mexico | 7–3 | | | |
| 1957 | Eastern New Mexico | 9–0–1 | | | |
| 1958 | Eastern New Mexico | 3–6–1 | | | |
| 1959 | Eastern New Mexico | 4–6 | | | |
| 1960 | Eastern New Mexico | 4–5 | | | |
| 1961 | Eastern New Mexico | 5–4–1 | | | |
| 1962 | Eastern New Mexico | 7–3 | | | |
| 1963 | Eastern New Mexico | 7–3 | | | |
| Eastern New Mexico: | | 57–37–3 | 0–4 | | |
| Total: | | 57–37–3 | | | |
