= Leroy Johnson =

Leroy Johnson may refer to:

- J. Leroy Johnson (1888–1961), United States congressman from California
- Leroy S. Johnson (1888–1986), leader of the Fundamentalist Church of Jesus Christ of Latter Day Saints
- Leroy Johnson (Medal of Honor) (1919–1944), American World War II soldier
- Leroy Johnson (Georgia politician) (1928–2019), American lawyer and politician
- LeRoy Johnson Jr. (1935–2011), editor and research archeologist at the Texas Historical Commission
- LeRoy Johnson (artist) (1937–2022), American artist
- LeRoy Johnson (politician) (born 1941), Canadian teacher, politician and former MLA for Wetaskiwin-Camrose, Alberta
- Leroy Johnson, fictional character in the Fame movie and television series
