= Barnes projectile point =

Prehistoric stone spearhead

A Barnes point is a type of projectile point dating from the Paleo-Indian period of American archaeology. It is a large, fluted spear point, lanceolate in shape, with "delicate ears" and a fishtail base. The fluting, or groove in the center of the point, tends to extend nearly the entire length of the point. Barnes points were mainly used to hunt megafauna.

Barnes points were first classified in 1963 by William Roosa, who recognized that apart from using a similar fluting technique to that of Folsom points, they were unique. What made Barnes point unique was that they had a moderate basal cavity followed by divergent sides and the presence of single underflute or Barnes fishing flake. He named them after the Barnes Creek area of Midland County, Michigan, where they were found at a location now known as the Barnes site. The Barnes site is a Paleo-Indian site, located in the center of the lower peninsula of Michigan, which dates to between 12,500 and 10,000 B.P. The site was discovered by Wallace Hill, who lived nearby, and staff of the University of Michigan Museum of Anthropology informed of its existence in 1959.

Barnes points are distributed throughout the lower northeastern United States, from Missouri to the Great Lakes area, extending into Canada. They are associated with the Early Paleoindian Parkhill complex of the eastern Great Lakes region, with sites being especially common in southwestern Ontario. They have also been found in northeastern Indiana, suggesting affinities between Indiana and the Great Lakes region during the early and middle portions of the Paleoindian period.
