= Cuproxena binotata =

Scientific classification
- Kingdom: Animalia
- Phylum: Arthropoda
- Clade: Pancrustacea
- Class: Insecta
- Order: Lepidoptera
- Family: Tortricidae
- Genus: Cuproxena
- Species: C. binotata

Binomial name
- Cuproxena binotata Brown & Obraztsov in Brown & Powell, 1991

Species of moth

Cuproxena binotata is a species of moth of the family Tortricidae. It is found in Santa Catarina, Brazil.
