= Cuproxena hoffmanana =

Scientific classification
- Kingdom: Animalia
- Phylum: Arthropoda
- Clade: Pancrustacea
- Class: Insecta
- Order: Lepidoptera
- Family: Tortricidae
- Genus: Cuproxena
- Species: C. hoffmanana

Binomial name
- Cuproxena hoffmanana Brown, in Brown & Powell, 1991

Species of moth

Cuproxena hoffmanana is a species of moth of the family Tortricidae. It is found in Santa Catarina, Brazil.
