= Cuproxena chelograpta =

Scientific classification
- Kingdom: Animalia
- Phylum: Arthropoda
- Class: Insecta
- Order: Lepidoptera
- Family: Tortricidae
- Genus: Cuproxena
- Species: C. chelograpta

Binomial name
- Cuproxena chelograpta (Meyrick, 1917)

Synonyms
- Cacoecia chelograpta Meyrick, 1917

Species of moth

Cuproxena chelograpta is a species of moth of the family Tortricidae. It is found in French Guiana.
