= Cuproxena platuncus =

Scientific classification
- Domain: Eukaryota
- Kingdom: Animalia
- Phylum: Arthropoda
- Class: Insecta
- Order: Lepidoptera
- Family: Tortricidae
- Genus: Cuproxena
- Species: C. platuncus

Binomial name
- Cuproxena platuncus Razowski & Wojtusiak, 2010

Species of moth

Cuproxena platuncus is a species of moth of the family Tortricidae. It is found in Peru.

The wingspan is 22 mm.
