= Neville archaeological site =

Archaeological site in Manchester, New Hampshire, U.S.

Coordinates: 43.003°N 71.4684°W

Neville is an archaeological site on the east bank of the Merrimack River in Manchester, New Hampshire in the United States.

The first occupants arrived during the Middle Archaic [around 8000 years Before Present (BP)] and left around 5900 BP. The first occupation, termed the Neville Complex, houses the remains of the "Neville" stemmed points. These were "bifacial projectile points with carefully shaped tips and symmetrical bodies."

The Neville site is 205 feet (62 m) above sea level and close to the Amoskeag Falls. Because the river provided an almost endless supply of fish, the site's location was probably important in attracting the first foragers to camp at the site. Dena Dincauze argues that Neville is a center for spring fishing and domestic activities but not hunting and plant processing. This is evidenced by the lack of hunting and plant processing tools.

The tools and points types found and named for the Neville site are believed to be a northeastern variant of Stanly stemmed points, a point type related to older Archaic sites in the southeastern United States. Neville points were produced between 7800 BP and 7000 BP and are found from Maine to New York. The Neville site shows that Middle Archaic people of the Northeastern United States had relationships with cultures along the Atlantic coast and those even further to the south. Before 7000 BP, a new projectile point form had appeared.

== Site excavation ==
The Neville site is named after its owner, John Neville, who received the property from the Stark family. For years it was not known to have any archaeological importance. It was not until the construction of a bridge threatened to destroy the site that the New Hampshire Archaeological Society took notice. The society began excavating the site in 1967 with the help of a team of volunteers.

One of the volunteers was an archaeologist and local resident named Peter McLane who excavated much more of the Neville site than the NHAS had planned on. At first McLane and his sons found only typical artifacts within the first few feet of soil. But as they proceeded to excavate further they found more artifacts. McLane chose to have one of the artifacts dated via charcoal sampling and found that it was 5,385 years old. The ancient date made this artifact one of the oldest artifacts in New England at the time. There were other artifacts found, both earlier and later, but these are believed to have been moved to the site from another location.

After the excavation, McLane had planned on writing the report for all of the artifacts and data recovered. However, he fell ill and was unable to complete the report. He then sent all of the data that had been recovered to Harvard University, requesting that Dena Dincauze finish the report, which she did.

== History ==
Native North Americans have been visiting the Neville site for more than 8000 years. The first residents arrived during the Middle Archaic period, about 7000 years ago. Dena Dincauze, who wrote the report on the site’s excavation, named the first inhabitants of the Neville site the "Neville Complex". It is likely that the first people to use this site chose the location because it was positioned next to a river that was rich in fish and a forest that contained other useful resources.

Despite the fact that the site was used primarily for fishing, there were no fish bones found during the excavation because the environment did not allow for their preservation. High levels of mercury in the soil, however, provides circumstantial evidence to suggest that a great deal of fishing was done at the site. Dincauze wrote that it is most likely that very little hunting or plant processing was performed at the site because "artifacts associated with such work were absent."

Since very little hunting or plant processing was performed, it is probable that the site was primarily used for fishing. Bands of people would probably camp at the site during the spring and make great use of its abundant fish resources throughout the springtime. When winter came and resources became scarce at the site, they would then move on to other locations where they might be able to forage for nuts or other more available resources. The first occupants of the site made use of "Neville" stemmed points which Fagan aptly describes as "bifacial projectile points with carefully shaped tips and symmetrical bodies, clearly intended for piercing." Because of the similarities between the Neville points and the Stanly stemmed points, it is believed that the Neville point could be a variant of the Stanly type. Neville points were made from 7800 BP to 7000 BP, when new projectile points began to appear and replace them, and can be found anywhere from Maine to Staten Island in New York. Besides the addition of new projectile points, the tool kit of the residents of the Neville site began to vary slightly, which might suggest a more varied range of things being done at the camp. This increased level of adaptation at the site could be evidence that the occupants began to remain there for longer periods of time, perhaps even eventually occupying the Neville site as an almost permanent camp where they remained nearly all year. Around ca. 5900 BP the site was abandoned for reasons that are not yet known. After 5900 BP it would seem as though the site was inhabited primarily by foragers and visited only intermittently.

== Significance ==
The Neville Site was a very significant site; it offered a great deal of information on the cultural systems of the Middle Archaic period. According to Dena Dincauze, "it remains to this date the thickest series of archeological deposits known in New England." The Neville site provides evidence that natives from the Northeast had cultural relationships with other societies along the Atlantic coast.
