= Cuproxena tarijae =

Scientific classification
- Domain: Eukaryota
- Kingdom: Animalia
- Phylum: Arthropoda
- Class: Insecta
- Order: Lepidoptera
- Family: Tortricidae
- Genus: Cuproxena
- Species: C. tarijae

Binomial name
- Cuproxena tarijae Razowski & Wojtusiak, 2013

Species of moth

Cuproxena tarijae is a species of moth of the family Tortricidae. It is found in Bolivia.

The wingspan is 18 mm.
