= Cuproxena nereidana =

Scientific classification
- Kingdom: Animalia
- Phylum: Arthropoda
- Clade: Pancrustacea
- Class: Insecta
- Order: Lepidoptera
- Family: Tortricidae
- Genus: Cuproxena
- Species: C. nereidana

Binomial name
- Cuproxena nereidana (Zeller, 1866)

Synonyms
- Teras nereidana Zeller, 1866

Species of moth

Cuproxena nereidana is a species of moth of the family Tortricidae. It is found in Colombia.
