= Old Cordilleran culture =

Archaeological culture

The old Cordilleran culture, also known as the Cascade phase, is an ancient culture of Native Americans that settled in the Pacific Northwestern region of North America that existed from 8000 or 9000 BC until about 3500 BC.

The Cascade phase may be even older, depending on when human beings first arrived in America. They originated in Alaska, and migrated to occupy a wide area as far as Idaho and the plateaus of California, but they are generally not considered a maritime society. However, their spear points, or points bearing resemblance have been found as far south as Mexico and South America. This was the typical artifact of these people — a simple, bi-facial, leaf-shaped projectile point which average about 6 cm (2.4 in) in length. These tools were used as spears or darts, or also knives, indicating the importance of hunting, although they also fished and gathered for subsistence. However, the main dependence was on land hunting, mostly of deer, bison, and other large mammals.

The culture possibly spoke a Macro-Penutian language (a hypothetical macrofamily which may include Penutian, Uto-Aztecan, and some other language families). This culture also created the oldest attested examples of art in the Pacific Northwest.

== See also ==
- Cascade point
