= Projectile point =

Primitive weapon component

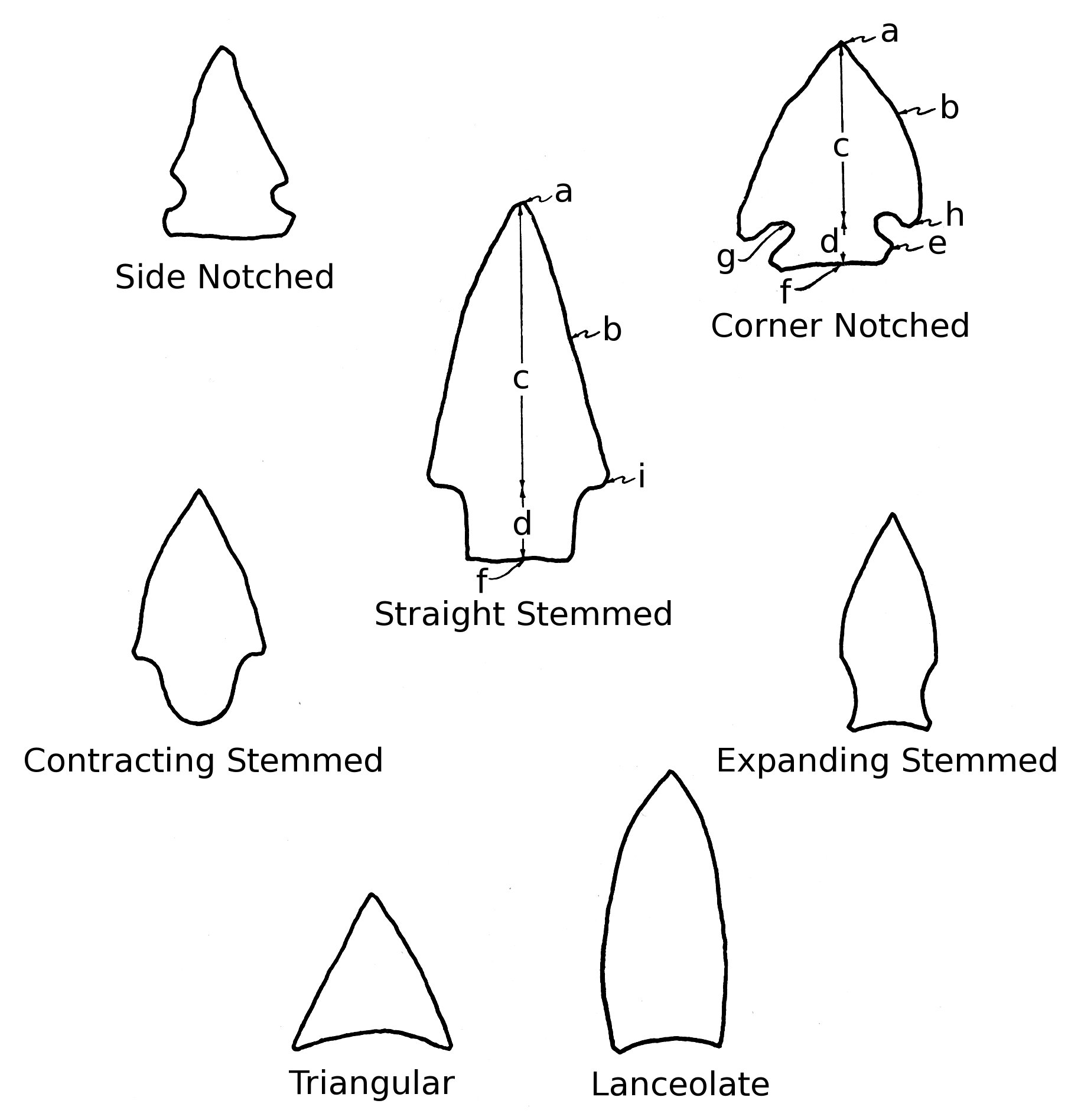
Standard projectile point terminology used in describing Native American projectile points: a – point or tip, b – edge, c – blade or face, d – step, e – tang, f – base, g – notch, h – barb, i – shoulder.

In archaeological terminology, a projectile point is an object that was hafted to a weapon that was capable of being thrown or projected, such as a javelin, dart, or arrow. They are thus different from weapons presumed to have been kept in the hand, such as knives, spears, axes, hammers, and maces.

Stone tools, including projectile points, were often lost or discarded and are relatively plentiful, especially at archaeological sites. They provide useful clues to the human past, including prehistoric trade. A distinctive form of point, identified though lithic analysis of the way it was made, is often a key diagnostic factor in identifying an archaeological industry or culture. Scientific techniques exist to track the specific kinds of rock or minerals that were used to make stone tools in various regions back to their original sources.

As well as stone, projectile points were also made of worked wood, bone, antler, horn, or ivory; all of these are less common in the Americas. In regions where metallurgy emerged, projectile points were eventually made from copper, bronze, or iron, though the change was by no means immediate. In North America, some late prehistoric points were fashioned from copper that was mined in the Lake Superior region and elsewhere.

== History in North America ==
A large variety of prehistoric arrowheads, dart points, javelin points, and spear points have been discovered. Chert, obsidian, quartzite, quartz, and many other rocks and minerals were commonly used to make points in North America. The oldest projectile points found in North America were long thought to date from about 13,000 years ago, during the Paleo-Indian period, however recent evidence suggests that North American projectile points may date to as old as 15,500 years. Some of the more famous Paleo-Indian types include Clovis, Folsom and Dalton points.

=== Types ===
Projectile points fall into two general types: dart or javelin points and arrow points. Larger points were used to tip atlatl javelins or darts and spears. Arrow points are smaller and lighter than dart points, and were used to tip arrows. The question of how to distinguish an arrow point from a point used on a larger projectile is non-trivial. According to some investigators, the best indication is the width of the hafting area, which is thought to correlate to the width of the shaft. An alternative approach is to distinguish arrow points by their necessarily smaller size (weight, length, thickness).

Projectile points come in a variety of shapes and styles, which vary according to chronological periods, cultural identities, and intended functions.

Typological studies of projectile points have become more elaborate through the years. For instance, Gregory Perino began his categorical study of projectile point typology in the late 1950s. Collaborating with Robert Bell, he published a set of four volumes defining the known point types of that time. Perino followed this several years later with a three-volume study of "Selected Preforms, Points and Knives of the North American Indians". Another recent set of typological studies of North American projectile points has been produced by Noel Justice.

=== Selected North American types ===
- Bare Island projectile point
- Barnes projectile point
- Cascade point
- Clovis point
- Cumberland point
- Eden point
- Elko point
- Folsom point
- Greene projectile point
- Jack's Reef pentagonal projectile point
- Lamoka projectile point
- Levanna projectile point
- Neville projectile point
- Susquehanna broad projectile point
- Plano point

== Australia ==
- Kimberley points

== Africa ==
- Aterian points
- Stillbay
- Klasies River Caves
- Porc Epic

== Gallery ==
Pre-historic projectile point from Lapa do Santo

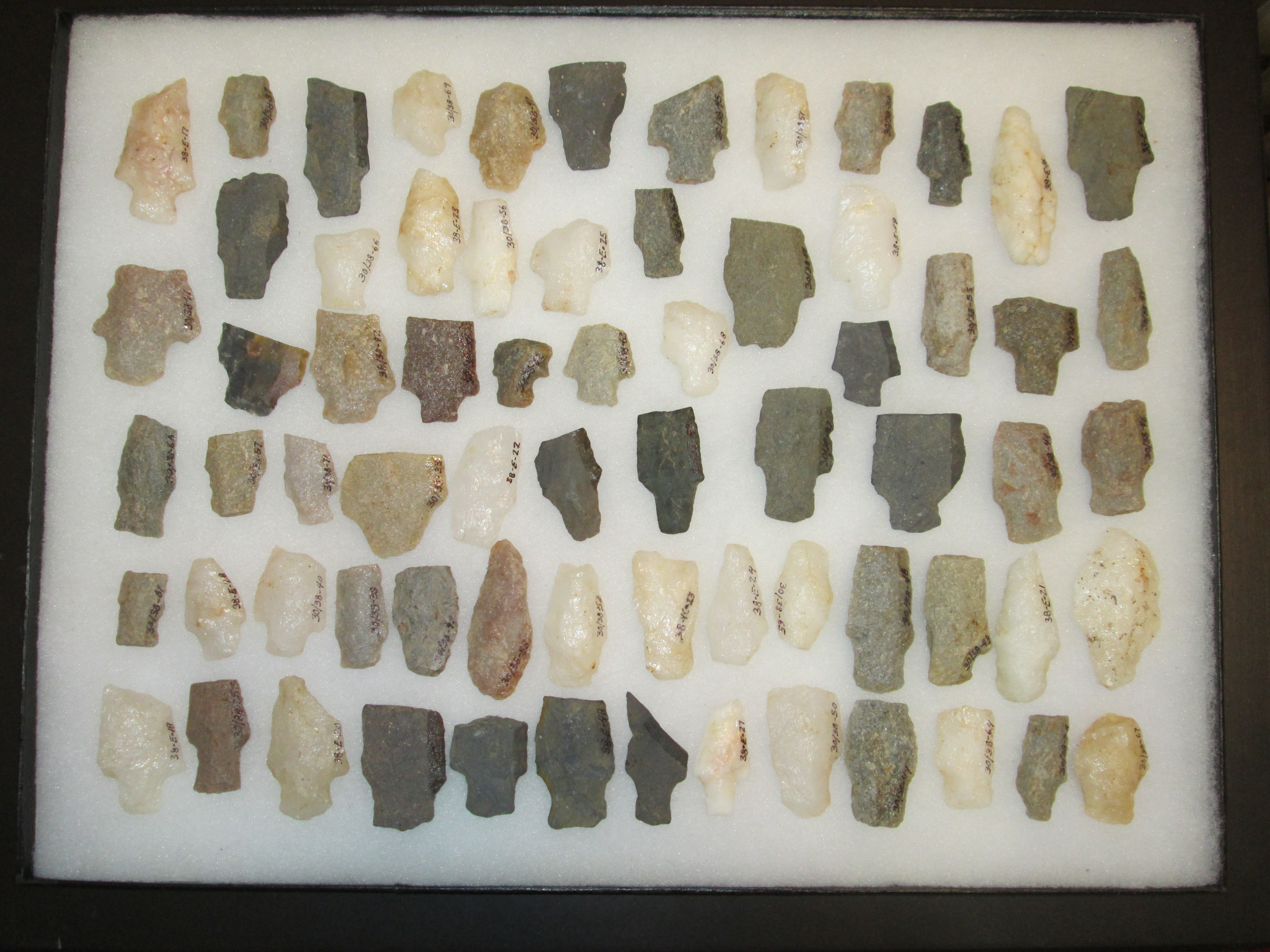
Prehistoric Native American projectile points from York County, Pennsylvania.

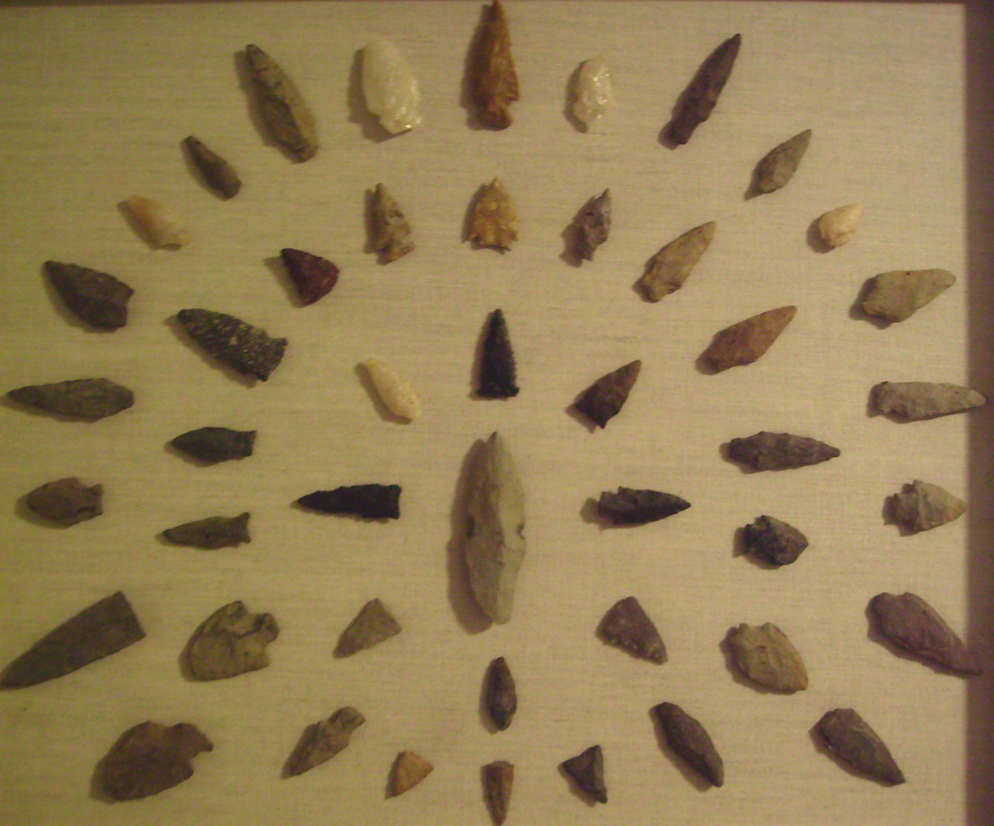
A collection of stone projectile points from North America.

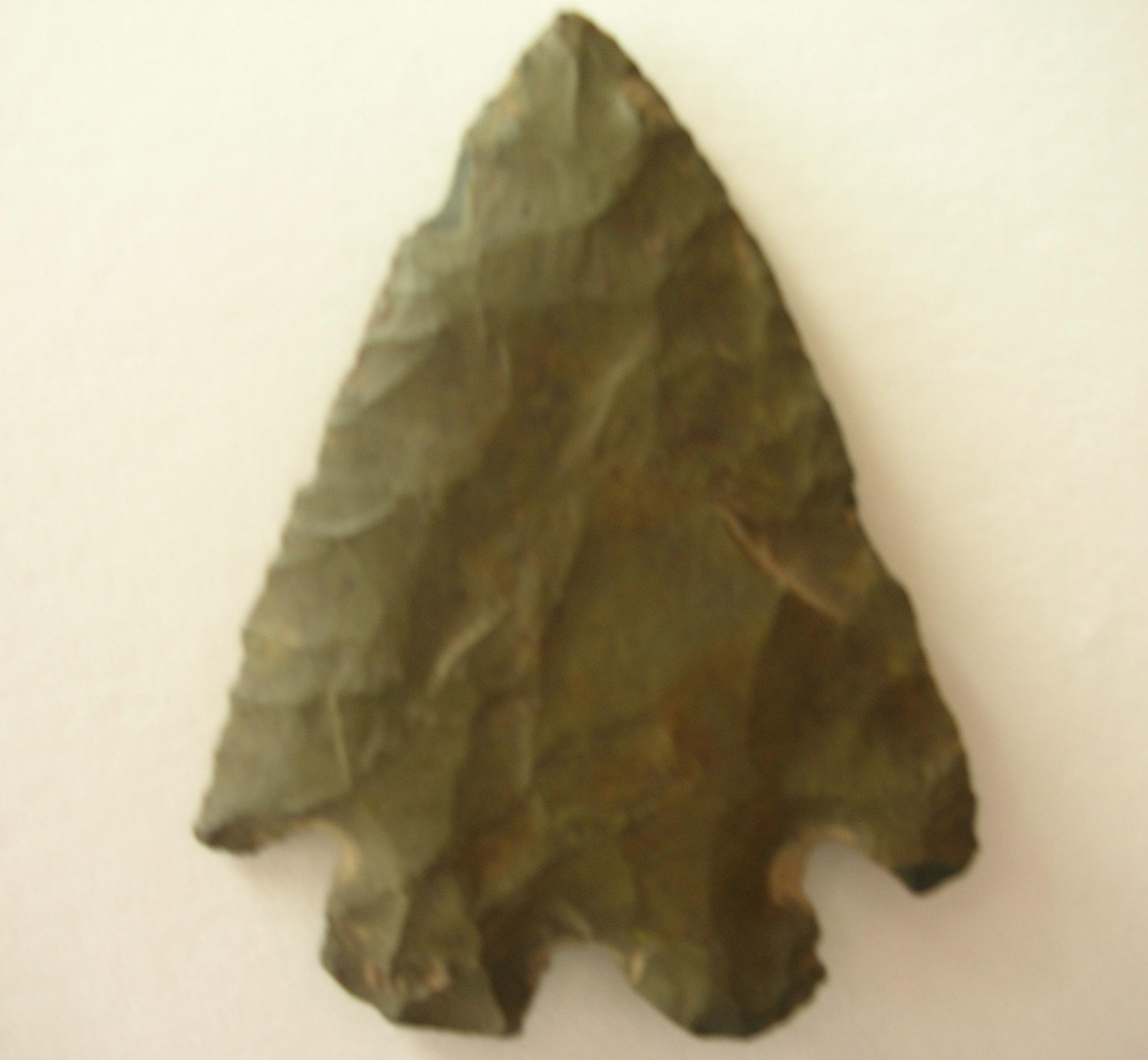
A knapped flint arrowhead.

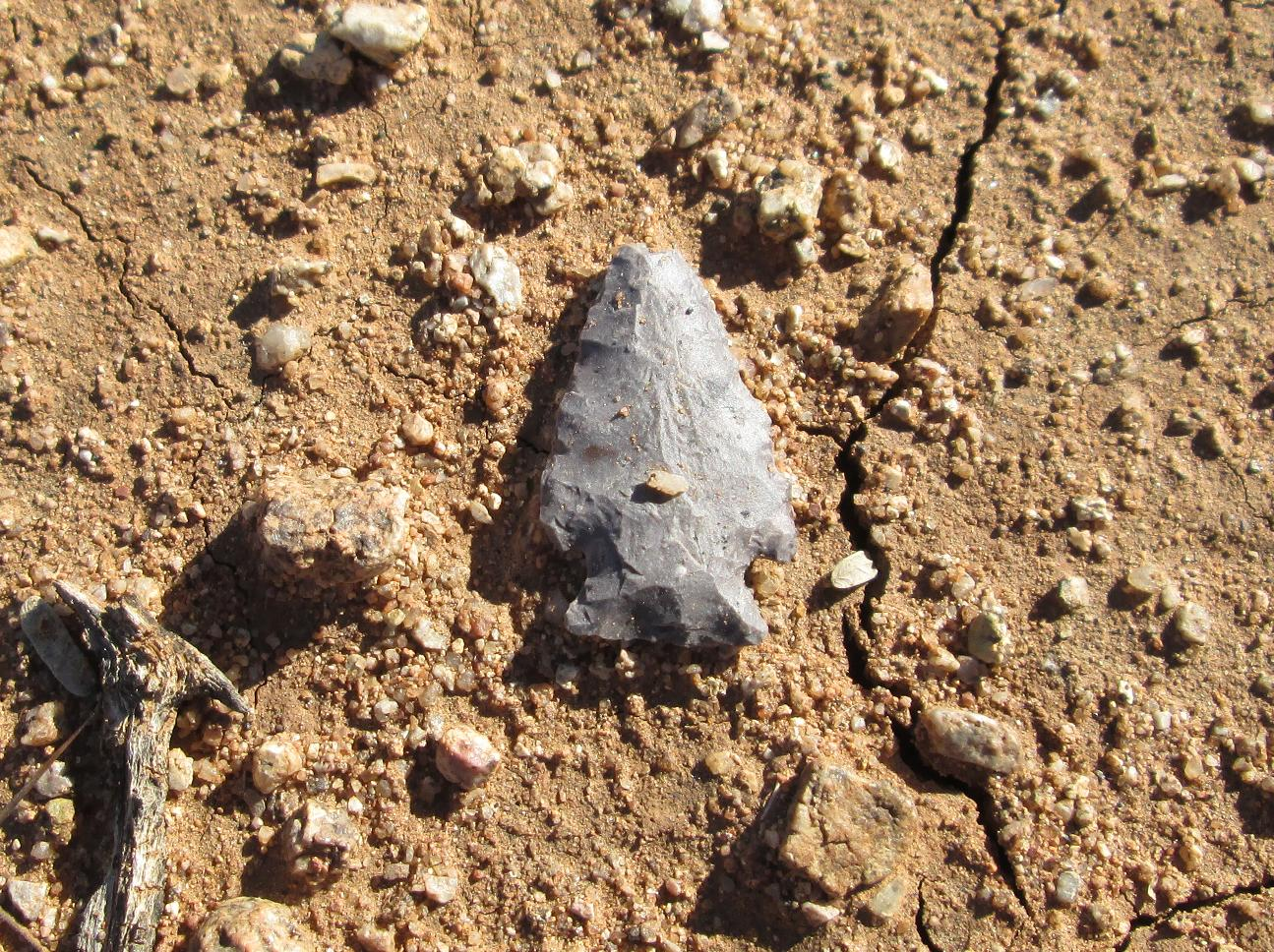
Prehistoric stone arrowhead in situ.

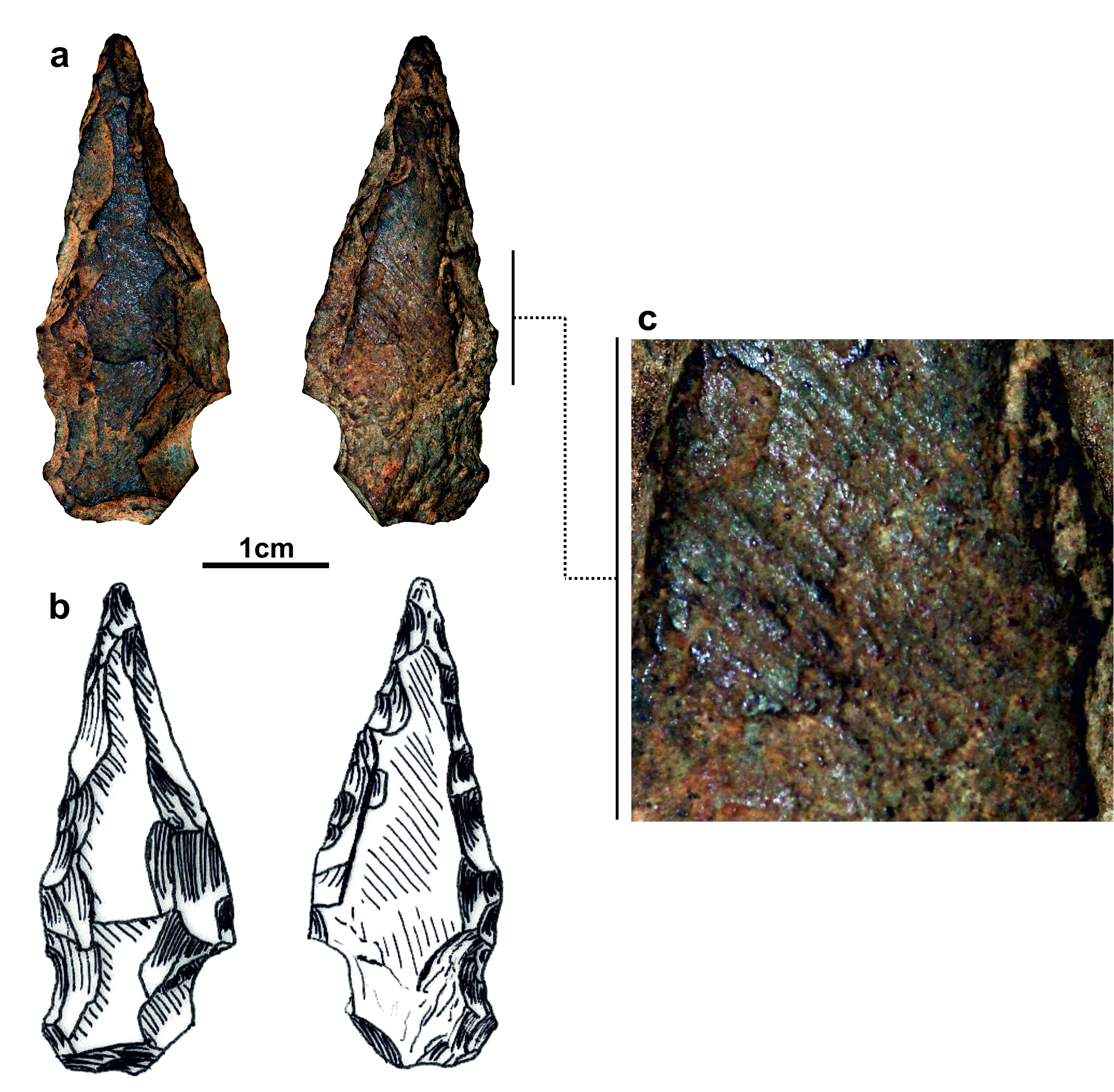
Prehistoric stone (Lapa do Lago, Brazil).

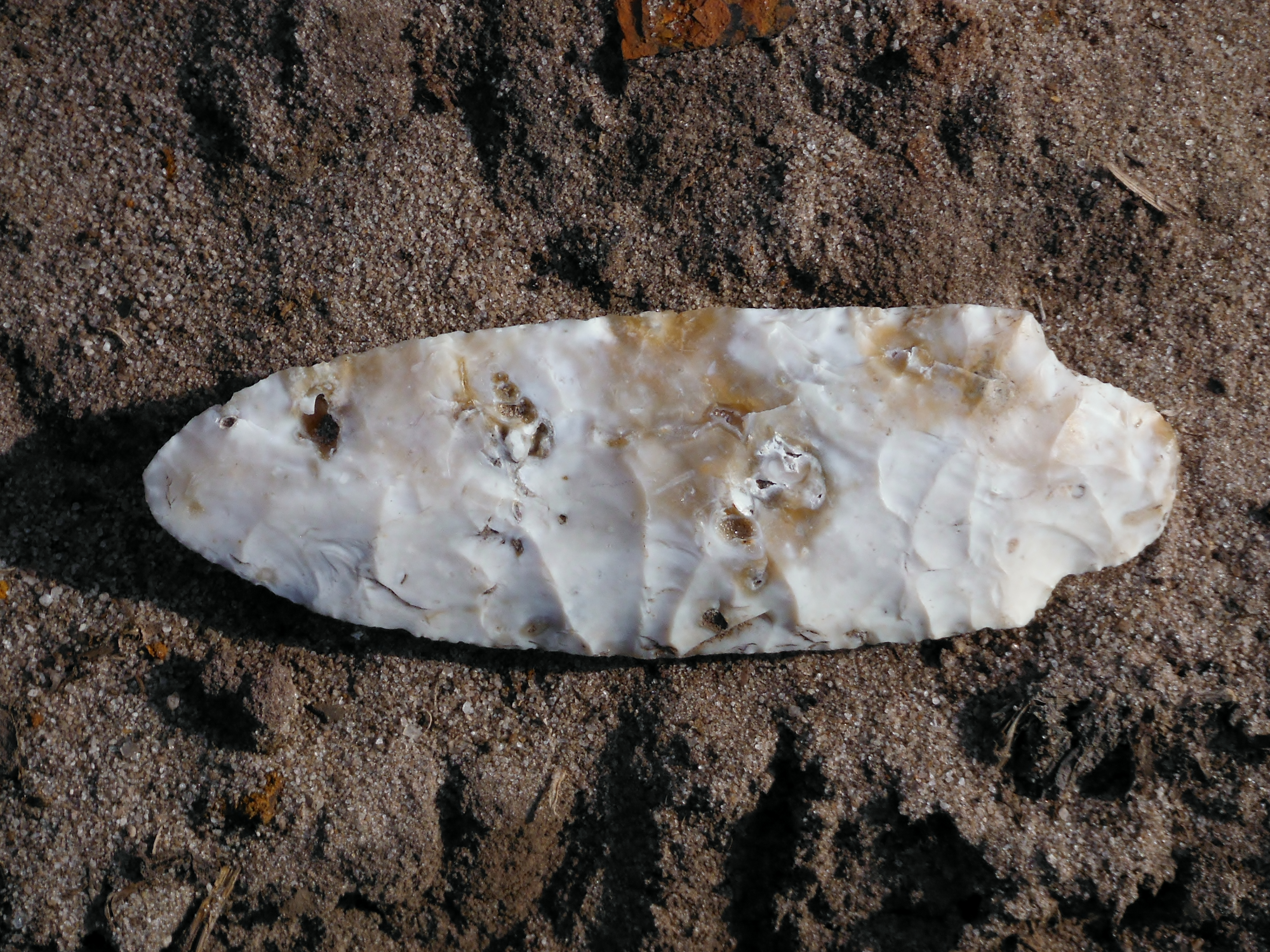
Thonotosassa type, Lorida, Florida.

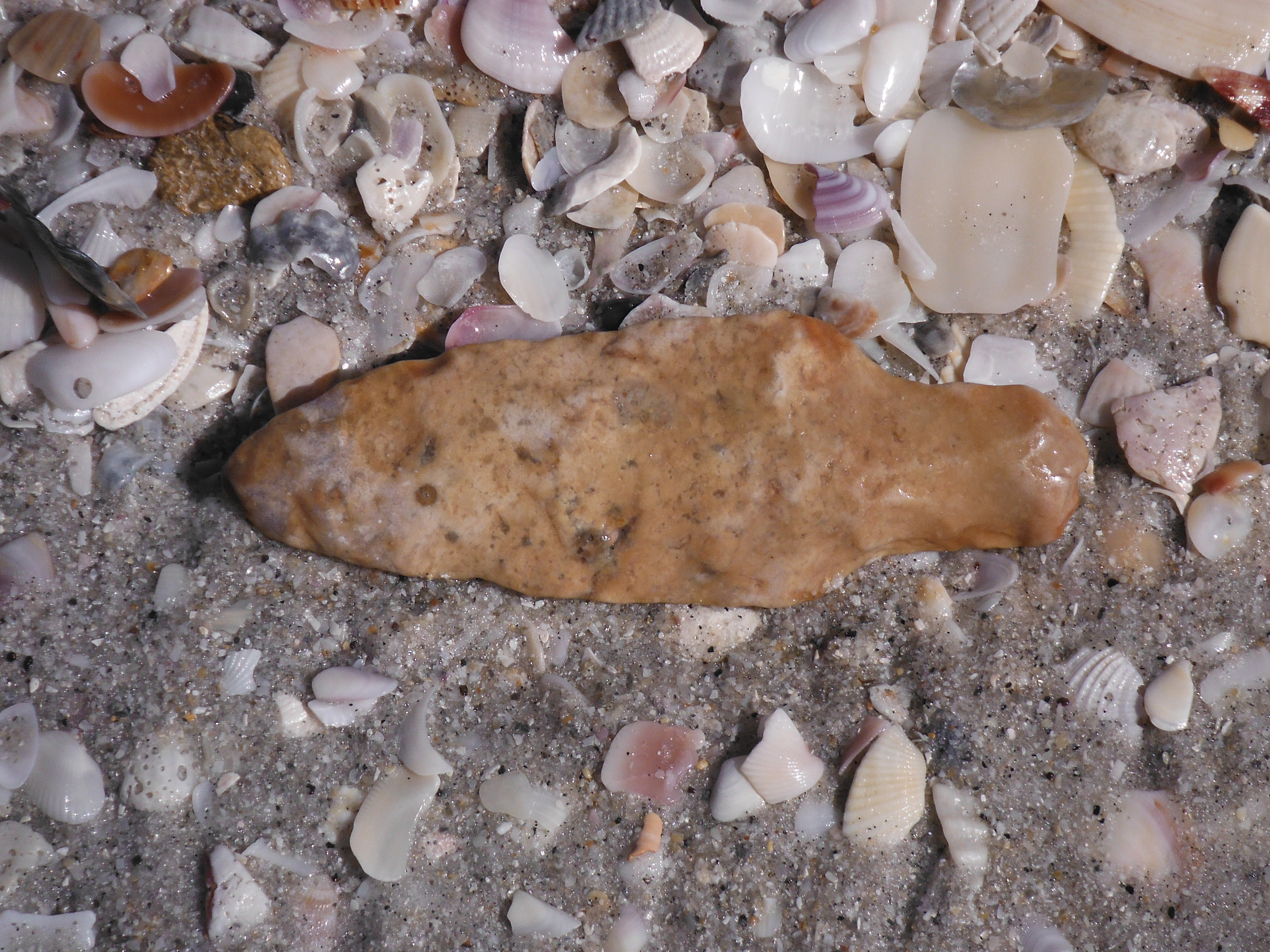
Little Gasparilla Island beach find.

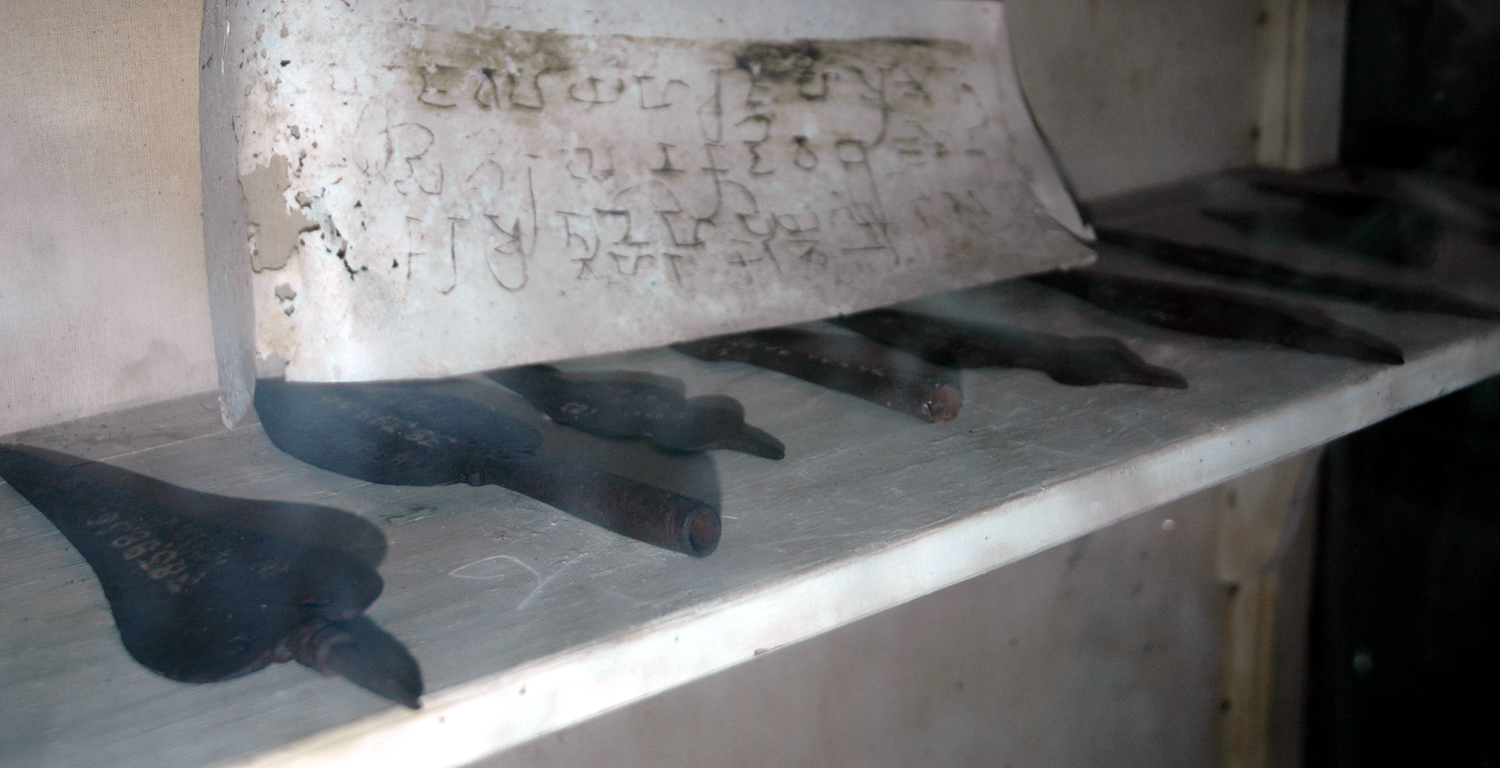
Ancient spear heads.

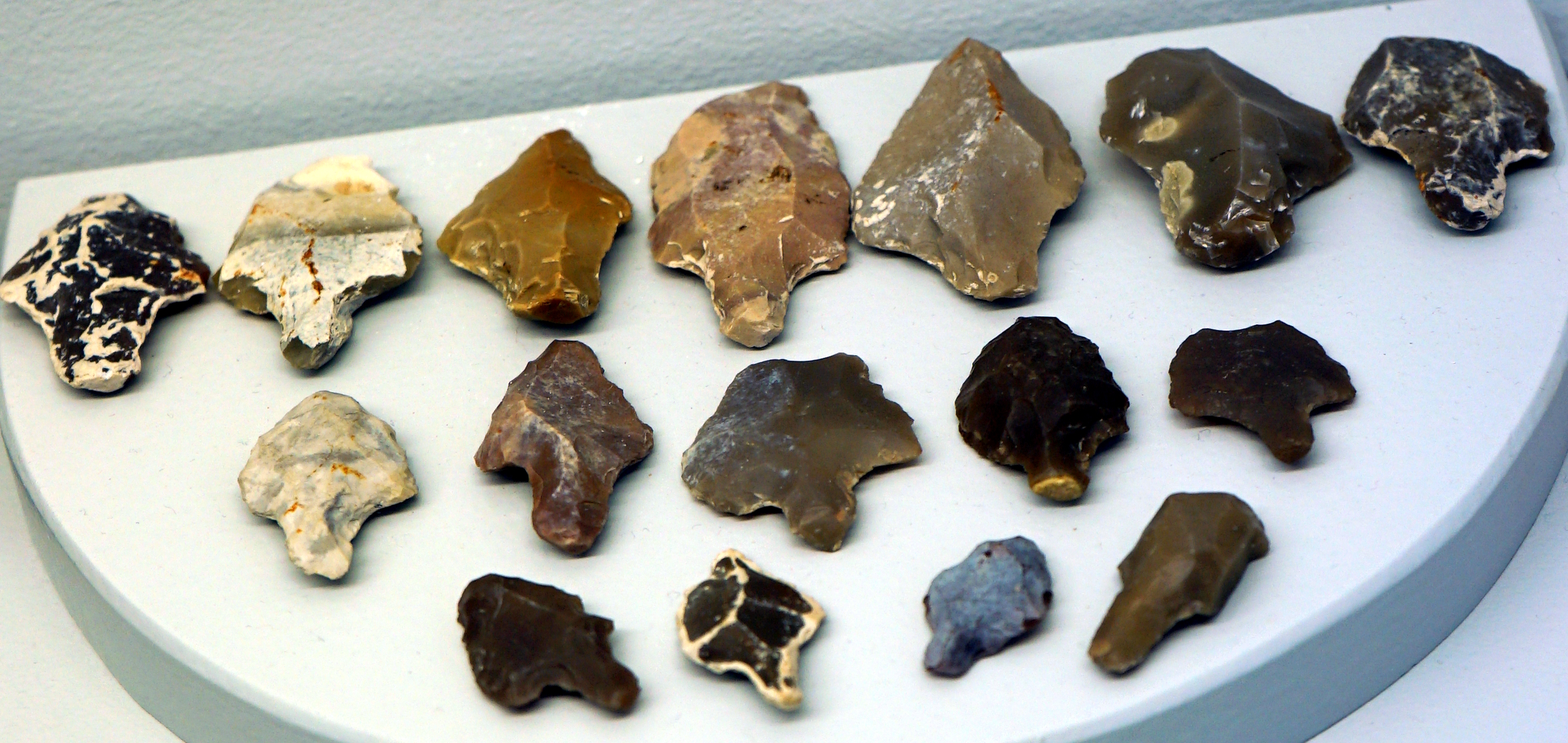
Tanged projectile points from the Aterian stone tool industry.

== See also ==
- Elf-arrow
- Levallois technique
- Lithic reduction
