= Cuproxena bramiliana =

Scientific classification
- Kingdom: Animalia
- Phylum: Arthropoda
- Clade: Pancrustacea
- Class: Insecta
- Order: Lepidoptera
- Family: Tortricidae
- Genus: Cuproxena
- Species: C. bramiliana

Binomial name
- Cuproxena bramiliana Brown, in Brown & Powell, 1991

Species of moth

Cuproxena bramiliana is a species of moth of the family Tortricidae. It is found in Rio de Janeiro, Brazil.
