= Cuproxena latiana =

Scientific classification
- Domain: Eukaryota
- Kingdom: Animalia
- Phylum: Arthropoda
- Class: Insecta
- Order: Lepidoptera
- Family: Tortricidae
- Genus: Cuproxena
- Species: C. latiana

Binomial name
- Cuproxena latiana Brown, 1991

Species of moth

Cuproxena latiana is a species of moth of the family Tortricidae. It is found in Venezuela and Ecuador (Napo Province).
