= Cuproxena astroboda =

Scientific classification
- Kingdom: Animalia
- Phylum: Arthropoda
- Clade: Pancrustacea
- Class: Insecta
- Order: Lepidoptera
- Family: Tortricidae
- Genus: Cuproxena
- Species: C. astroboda

Binomial name
- Cuproxena astroboda (Razowski & Becker, 1990)

Synonyms
- Chrysoxena astroboda Razowski & Becker, 1990

Species of moth

Cuproxena astroboda is a species of moth of the family Tortricidae. It is found in Paraná, Brazil.
