= Cuproxena auga =

Scientific classification
- Kingdom: Animalia
- Phylum: Arthropoda
- Clade: Pancrustacea
- Class: Insecta
- Order: Lepidoptera
- Family: Tortricidae
- Genus: Cuproxena
- Species: C. auga

Binomial name
- Cuproxena auga (Razowski & Becker, 1990)

Synonyms
- Dorithia auga Razowski & Becker, 1990

Species of moth

Cuproxena auga is a species of moth of the family Tortricidae. Its type locality is Curitiba, Paraná, Brazil, and its range includes parts of northern Argentina, Bolivia, and southeastern Brazil, including Bahia, Espírito Santo and Santa Catarina.

It was moved from the genus Dorithia to Cuproxena in 1991.
