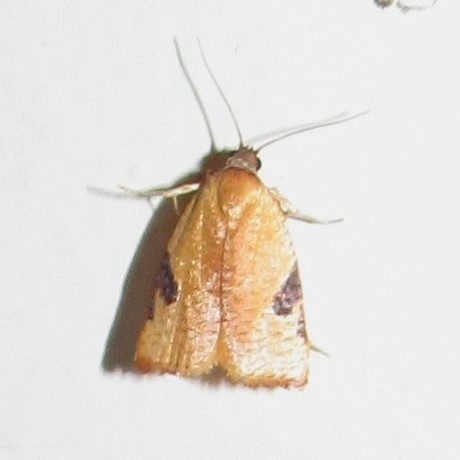

Scientific classification
- Kingdom: Animalia
- Phylum: Arthropoda
- Clade: Pancrustacea
- Class: Insecta
- Order: Lepidoptera
- Family: Tortricidae
- Tribe: Euliini
- Genus: Cuproxena; Powell & Brown, 1991

= Cuproxena =

Genus of tortrix moths

Cuproxena is a genus of moths belonging to the family Tortricidae.

== Species ==
- Cuproxena aequitana Razowski & Pelz, 2007
- Cuproxena amplana Razowski & Pelz, 2007
- Cuproxena anielae (Razowski & Becker, 1990)
- Cuproxena argentina Brown, in Brown & Powell, 1991
- Cuproxena astroboda (Razowski & Becker, 1990)
- Cuproxena auga (Razowski & Becker, 1990)
- Cuproxena auriculana Razowski & Pelz, 2007
- Cuproxena binotata Brown & Obraztsov in Brown & Powell, 1991
- Cuproxena bramiliana Brown, in Brown & Powell, 1991
- Cuproxena cara Brown, in Brown & Powell, 1991
- Cuproxena chelograpta (Meyrick, 1917)
- Cuproxena cornuta Brown & Obraztsov in Brown & Powell, 1991
- Cuproxena duckworthorum Brown, in Brown & Powell, 1991
- Cuproxena elongana Brown, in Brown & Powell, 1991
- Cuproxena eudiometra (Razowski & Becker, 1990)
- Cuproxena flintana Brown, in Brown & Powell, 1991
- Cuproxena flosculana (Walsingham, 1914)
- Cuproxena golondrina Razowski & Wojtusiak, 2008
- Cuproxena hoffmanana Brown, in Brown & Powell, 1991
- Cuproxena latiana Brown, in Brown & Powell, 1991
- Cuproxena minimana Brown, in Brown & Powell, 1991
- Cuproxena neonereidana Brown, in Brown & Powell, 1991
- Cuproxena nereidana (Zeller, 1866)
- Cuproxena nudana Razowski & Pelz, 2007
- Cuproxena paracornuta Brown, in Brown & Powell, 1991
- Cuproxena paramplana Razowski & Pelz, 2007
- Cuproxena platuncus Razowski & Wojtusiak, 2010
- Cuproxena pseudoplesia Brown, in Brown & Powell, 1991
- Cuproxena quinquenotata (Walker, 1863)
- Cuproxena serrata Brown, in Brown & Powell, 1991
- Cuproxena speculana (Walsingham, 1914)
- Cuproxena subunicolora Brown & Obraztsov in Brown & Powell, 1991
- Cuproxena tarijae Razowski & Wojtusiak, 2013
- Cuproxena trema Brown & Obraztsov in Brown & Powell, 1991
- Cuproxena triphera Brown & Obraztsov in Brown & Powell, 1991
- Cuproxena virifloscula Brown, in Brown & Powell, 1991

== See also ==
- List of Tortricidae genera
