= Cuproxena cornuta =

Scientific classification
- Domain: Eukaryota
- Kingdom: Animalia
- Phylum: Arthropoda
- Class: Insecta
- Order: Lepidoptera
- Family: Tortricidae
- Genus: Cuproxena
- Species: C. cornuta

Binomial name
- Cuproxena cornuta Brown & Obraztsov in Brown & Powell, 1991

Species of moth

Cuproxena cornuta is a species of moth of the family Tortricidae. It is found in Costa Rica.
