= Baker Cave =

Archaeological site in Texas (US)

Coordinates: 30.0083°N 101.0771°W

Baker Cave is a prehistoric archaeological site, located on a small canyon near Devils River in Southwest Texas. Dating from circa 7,000–7,800 BCE, Baker Cave is a part of a system of rock shelters in the Lower Pecos Canyons region and was 120 feet long by 56 feet deep (37 m × 17 m). The ceiling varied from 18 feet (5.5 m) at the mouth to just a few inches in the back.

These sites are common in the limestone formations in the Lower Pecos region. The site was perched well above the flood, preserving the materials that ancient peoples had left behind. A large cooking hearth was found inside it, dating to around 9,000 years ago, and containing small creatures such as snakes, rats, fish, and rabbits, and a wide variety of seeds and nuts, indicating a diversified diet. The recovery of a complete Golondrina point established Paleo-Indian residence in Baker Cave. They were estimated, by radiocarbon dating, to have been there sometime between 7080 BCE and 6960 BCE. These dates are older and not consistent with other sites in the area. Potential contamination of the charcoal tested could have led to this difference in dates. The people at Baker Cave had an archaic life and lived off small game and foraging. The mouth of the cave was primarily used for cooking, the middle of everyday life routine, and the rear of the cave for food processing. No further research has been done on Baker Cave; however, the Lower Pecos Region of Texas has numerous other cave excavations ongoing.

== History ==
The site was named after the Baker family, who owned the land and allowed archaeological research in the shelter. The Baker family had protected the site from looters, as did its isolated location. The first fieldwork began in April 1962, by archaeologists from the University of Texas at Austin's Archaeology Research Lab, who designated the shelter 41 VV 213.

James H. Word directed the majority of the archaeological investigation together with University of Texas archaeologists E. Mott Davis and T.N. Campbell. The Texas Memorial Museum also sent Mr. Curtis Tunnel and Texas Technological College sent Mr. John W. Greer and Dr. David R. Kelley. Mrs. Anne Fox from the Witte Memorial Museum was also on the project team. Many volunteers also donated their time and skills.

== Significance ==
Baker Cave was significant in the fact it was completely undisturbed at the start of the excavations. The top layers yielded debitage from the Early Archaic and the Late Archaic. The earliest deposits were late Paleo-Indian projectile points of the Plainview Golondrina type. Charcoal from the early deposits were radiocarbon dated to 8910 BP and 9030 BP. Also, a large cooking hearth feature was found. The bones in the hearth included snakes, rats, fish, rabbits, and other small animals, which showed that people used everything possibly available. These dietary indicators were discovered because flotation procedures were used, a very early example of the use of this technique. Roughly 10,000 bones were found during the excavation of Baker Cave. One-third of the bones were fish, while the other two-thirds were mammalian and reptilian. Many of the fragments were tiny and could not be assigned to a specific genus. Also, many of the bones showed charring, some of this occurred during cooking and sometimes it occurred when they were trying to get rid of the bones they no longer needed. Oddly enough, rabbit bones were almost always charred while rat bones were never charred, which could be due to cooking methods. The cave has an unblackened roof, which may be due to rapid spalling of the roofs or updrafting winds acting as a vent and carrying smoke out of the cave.

== Techniques ==
In the northernmost part of the shelter, on a large roof spall, a datum point was set up. From this datum point, the shelter was grided out into units that were 5 feet (1.5 m) wide.

Excavation of the first unit was for test purposes. Depth of deposits, nature of occupational deposits, and the stratification patterns were determined so future units could be dug by strata. Deposits from this unit were screened through quarter-inch mesh with artifacts labeled by unit and level in which they were recovered. All flint, bone, shell, and wood were kept; only samples of vegetal matter were retained because the amount to keep was too large. Unit 2 was dug second, and lay just south of unit 1. Unit 3 began next because the landowners requested it. Soon after, unit 6 was opened up in the extreme rear of the cave, 35 feet (11 m) from the back corner of unit 1. Unit 6 was used to determine difference in usage from the back of the cave to the front.

At first, units were dug in 6-inch levels (15 cm), until strata and deposits became more clear and easy to follow. The strata were numbered according to a system that was used for the entire project. However, the strata were not continuous through all of the units, and often split into two strata in adjacent units. Because of this, some of the strata were grouped into zones. The researchers defined zones as "a major division distinguishable from other soil units on the basis of rather distinct changes in soil color, content, and texture". Five zones, plus the surface, were in the excavation.

== Zones ==
Zone one (7500–6500 BCE), starting from the top, included two strata near the front of the shelter. It consisted of limestone that was 1 to 24 inches (2.5 to 61.0 cm) thick. However, towards the back of the shelter, zone one contained a third stratum that was distinguished by a sterile line of deposits. Zone one contained some fire-cracked hearthstones, large flint debris, rodent bones, some cracked deer bone, and near the middle of the cave, late Paleo-Indian points were recovered. Units 6, 9, 10, and 14 in zone one, contained a higher level of charcoal, some fine and some in lumps.

Zone two (6500–4000 BCE) contained a greater variation of strata than zone one. Unit 1 only had one stratum, but units 7, 8, 9, 10, and 14 consisted of three strata and a lens in zone two, and unit 6 had two strata. The top portions of zone two do not show signs of fire, but they do show signs of decay, which would indicate moisture in the soil. Vegetal matter was a little less sparse, only mescal bean hulls and the hulls of pecans, walnuts, and acorns were found. Flint chips and charcoal were also found, but smaller in size than zone one. The rodent bones decreased throughout this zone, but the frequency of large animal bones, like deer, increased. Lithic artifacts also increased in zone two.

Zone three (4000–2500 BCE) had a marked lower level of moisture than zone two. Hearth rocks and small roof spalls are common in this zone. Small flint scrap, quids, prickly pear leaves, mescal beans, pecans, walnuts, and acorns were also present. Fibrous and lithic artifacts were found along with an increase in rodents and birds and a decrease in deer. Zone three also had a white ash lens in units 6, 9, and 10. The assumed thought of occurrence is a large fire. In unit 6, a second lens is present under the first, probably from higher heat intensity.

Zone four (2500–1000 BCE) has a very diverse set of strata. Unit 1 consisted of three strata with the lowest being intense fire-cracked rock and ash. The upper two strata have high charcoal levels and these layers feel greasy. Two strata make up units 6, 7, 8, 9, 10, and 14. Also, a lens was found in units 14, 10, and 9. This lens has ashy tan soil and a great deal of fibrous materials. The lithics in this zone are mainly fire-fractured, and deer, rodent, and fish bones have been found also. The soil in this zone is representative of localized fires. An overall increase in lithic, bone, and fibrous artifacts was noted in this zone.

Zone five (1000 BCE–1000 CE) contains three strata through all of the units and contains much fiber. Fiber artifacts were more numerous than the other artifacts found, such as fire-cracked rock, mesquite beans, mescal beans, leaves, pecans, walnuts, persimmon seeds, pods of sotol, sacahuista, and lechuguilla. Knotted fibers were commonly found along with woven fibers. In units 6, 8, and 10, charcoal was found; also in unit 6, a large fiber lens was noted.

The surface was tentatively dated 1000–1600 CE.

== Features ==
During the excavations at Baker Cave, many features were found, including hearths. Most of the hearths were round and bowl-shaped. Their size ranged from 12.5 to 26 inches (32 to 66 cm) on the long axis and 15 to 25 inches (38 to 64 cm) on the short axis. Feature number one was found in unit 2 in the top layer of zone five. It was a mass of grass bound with twigs that measured 4.08 in thick, 9.67 in long and 7.0 in wide (10.4 cm × 24.6 cm × 18 cm). Feature number two was located under a boulder in unit 3 and zone four. It was an antler from a whitetail deer that looked to have been intentionally placed under the boulder. Feature three was an unused pit and 12 pear internodes that had been tied with split sacahuista. The pit measured 25 by 26 inches (64 cm × 66 cm). The pear internodes were stacked in layers and bundled 5.0 inches (13 cm) northwest of the unused pit; they were located in zone five. Feature four contained 53 sotol or lechuguilla flower stalks and spread across units 6, 9, 10, 11, 12, and 13. These stalks are believed to have been the base for a screen, which could have served as a backrest for occupants. Feature five was located in unit 9 and zone three. It was a small pit measuring 4.5 by 3.5 in and about 2.9 in deep (11 cm × 8.9 cm × 7.4 cm). It was also filled with flint and broken bifaces. Features six and seven were combined because they were both bowl-shaped pits in the same unit. They were mainly in unit 13 and spread into unit 9. Both pits were filled with fiber, and they seemingly were intended to be hearths. Lastly, feature number eight was the burial that was later discovered by Jim Baker. It was located 2 ft (0.61 m) behind unit 12, and the bones were about 2.4 ft (0.73 m) below the surface. The skull fragments were from an infant.
