= Cuproxena quinquenotata =

Scientific classification
- Kingdom: Animalia
- Phylum: Arthropoda
- Class: Insecta
- Order: Lepidoptera
- Family: Tortricidae
- Genus: Cuproxena
- Species: C. quinquenotata

Binomial name
- Cuproxena quinquenotata (Walker, 1863)

Synonyms
- Conchylis quinquenotata Walker, 1863

Species of moth

Cuproxena quinquenotata is a species of moth of the family Tortricidae. It is found in Amazonas, Brazil.
