= Cuproxena nudana =

Scientific classification
- Kingdom: Animalia
- Phylum: Arthropoda
- Class: Insecta
- Order: Lepidoptera
- Family: Tortricidae
- Genus: Cuproxena
- Species: C. nudana

Binomial name
- Cuproxena nudana Razowski & Pelz, 2007

Species of moth

Cuproxena nudana is a species of moth of the family Tortricidae. It is found in Napo Province, Ecuador.

The wingspan is 17–19.5 mm (0.67–0.77 in) for males and 22 mm (0.87 in) for females.
