= Cuproxena auriculana =

Scientific classification
- Kingdom: Animalia
- Phylum: Arthropoda
- Clade: Pancrustacea
- Class: Insecta
- Order: Lepidoptera
- Family: Tortricidae
- Genus: Cuproxena
- Species: C. auriculana

Binomial name
- Cuproxena auriculana Razowski & Pelz, 2007

Species of moth

Cuproxena auriculana is a species of moth of the family Tortricidae. It is found in Napo Province, Ecuador.

The wingspan is 20 mm.
