= Cuproxena speculana =

Scientific classification
- Domain: Eukaryota
- Kingdom: Animalia
- Phylum: Arthropoda
- Class: Insecta
- Order: Lepidoptera
- Family: Tortricidae
- Genus: Cuproxena
- Species: C. speculana

Binomial name
- Cuproxena speculana (Walsingham, 1914)

Synonyms
- Tortrix speculana Walsingham, 1914

Species of moth

Cuproxena speculana is a species of moth of the family Tortricidae. It is found in Guatemala.

Average wingspan is about 22 mm. The forewings are white with a delicate brown shade at the basal portion. The hindwings are silvery white.
