= Cuproxena flosculana =

Scientific classification
- Domain: Eukaryota
- Kingdom: Animalia
- Phylum: Arthropoda
- Class: Insecta
- Order: Lepidoptera
- Family: Tortricidae
- Genus: Cuproxena
- Species: C. flosculana

Binomial name
- Cuproxena flosculana (Walsingham, 1914)

Synonyms
- Tortrix flosculana Walsingham, 1914; Eulia tephrodelta Meyrick, 1932

Species of moth

Cuproxena flosculana is a species of moth of the family Tortricidae. It is found in Mexico (Veracruz) and Guatemala.

The wingspan is about 13 mm. The forewings are tawny reddish, becoming golden yellow on the upper half of the base and along the edge of the costa. The hindwings are ochreous red.
