= Cuproxena amplana =

Scientific classification
- Kingdom: Animalia
- Phylum: Arthropoda
- Class: Insecta
- Order: Lepidoptera
- Family: Tortricidae
- Genus: Cuproxena
- Species: C. amplana

Binomial name
- Cuproxena amplana Razowski & Pelz, 2007

Species of moth

Cuproxena amplana is a species of moth of the family Tortricidae. It is found in Napo Province, Ecuador.

The wingspan is 19–22.5 mm.
