= Cuproxena aequitana =

Scientific classification
- Kingdom: Animalia
- Phylum: Arthropoda
- Class: Insecta
- Order: Lepidoptera
- Family: Tortricidae
- Genus: Cuproxena
- Species: C. aequitana

Binomial name
- Cuproxena aequitana Razowski & Pelz, 2007

Species of moth

Cuproxena aequitana is a species of moth of the family Tortricidae. It is found in Napo Province, Ecuador.

The wingspan is 19.5 mm.

== Etymology ==
The species name refers to the uniform colouration and is derived from Latin aequitas (meaning uniformity, evenness).
