= Plano point =

Lithic projectile points used in ancient North America

In archaeology, Plano points are flaked stone projectile points and tools created by the various Plano cultures of the North American Great Plains between 9000 BC and 6000 BC for hunting, and possibly to kill other humans.

They are bifacially worked and have been divided into numerous sub-groups based on variations in size, shape and function including Alberta points, Cody points, Frederick points, Eden points and Scottsbluff points. Plano points do not include the hollowing or 'fluting' found in Clovis and Folsom points.

== See also ==
- Other projectile points
