= Scottsbluff point =

Paleolithic spearhead style

A Scottsbluff point is a type of North American projectile point, named for their 1932 discovery in situ at Scottsbluff Bison Quarry in Scottsbluff, Nebraska, United States. They are usually large late Paleolithic lanceolate spearheads, and were stereotypically used for hunting American bison and other large prey animals. They are considered part of the Cody cultural complex, dating to around 7000 BC, or around 9000 to 8600 BP. The Cody complex, named for Cody, Wyoming, is marked by co-occurrence of Eden and Scottsbluff points, and Cody knives. Scottsbluff points are typically found in the plains between the Rockies and the Mississippi River valley. Scottsbluff points typically have a square stem and "transverse parallel pressure flaking that terminates at the midline, producing a biconvex cross section". The difference between an Eden point and a Scottsbluff point, first described in 1957, is that the former "is much narrower in relation to its length, has a less strongly indented stem, and usually has collateral flaking that produces a diamond-shaped cross-section". Alberta points also co-occur in this complex.

== See also ==
- American bison hunting
