= Puerto Golondrina =

Coordinates: 54°50′S 68°21′W

Puerto Golondrina is a suburb of the City of Ushuaia, capital of the Tierra del Fuego Province, Argentina, located just west of the city centre near the Airport.

It was first established as a military prison but after the prison was merged with the main prison in Ushuaia in 1910, Puerto Golondrina continued as a fishing port. Today it is part of the outer suburbs of Ushuaia, has several Hotels and it is generally referred to as "Bahia Golondrina", the small Bay that has the Ushuaia International Airport as its southern shoreline and the Golondrina suburb as its northern shoreline.
