= Cuproxena golondrina =

Scientific classification
- Kingdom: Animalia
- Phylum: Arthropoda
- Clade: Pancrustacea
- Class: Insecta
- Order: Lepidoptera
- Family: Tortricidae
- Genus: Cuproxena
- Species: C. golondrina

Binomial name
- Cuproxena golondrina Razowski & Wojtusiak, 2008

Species of moth

Cuproxena golondrina is a species of moth of the family Tortricidae. It is found in Carchi Province, Ecuador.

The wingspan is about 16.5 mm.

== Etymology ==
The species name refers to the type locality, the Forest Reserve Golondrinas.
