= LeRoy Johnson Jr. =

American archaeologist (1935–2011)

LeRoy Johnson Jr. (September 10, 1935 in Lubbock, Texas – February 4, 2011 in Austin, Texas) was an American editor and research archeologist at the Texas Historical Commission, where he analyzed and reported on a series of major archeological excavations of prehistoric campsites in central Texas. Artifacts discovered at the Devil's Mouth site, in the Amistad Reservoir, Texas led Johnson to name the Plainview Golondrina point (now the Golondrina point) in 1964.
