= Greene projectile point =

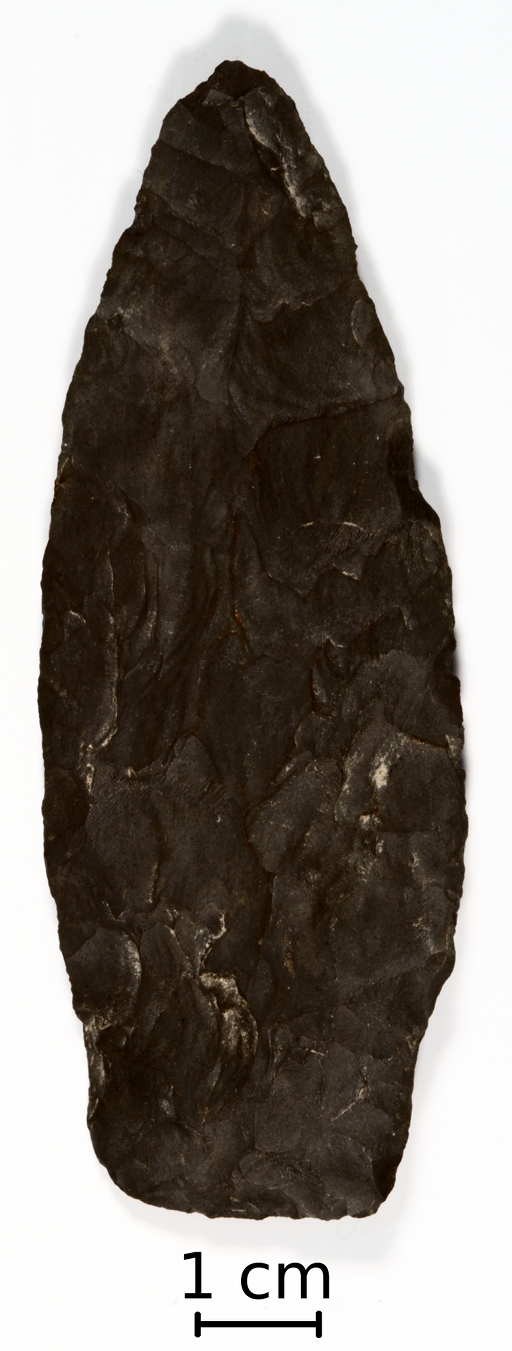
Greene projectile point from central New York State

Greene projectile points are stone projectile points manufactured by Native Americans what is now the Northeastern United States generally in the time interval of 300–800 AD.

== Description ==
Greene points are generally about 2 to 4 inches (5.1 to 10.2 cm) long with an average around 2.5 inches (6.4 cm). They are lanceolate in shape with weak or no shoulders and are 2¼ to 2½ times as long as they are wide.

== Age and cultural affiliations ==
Their first recorded appearance is around 400 AD and vanished around 800 AD with the onset of the Kipp Island phase in central New York.

== Distribution ==
These points are found primarily in the middle Hudson Valley of New York State, but are found as far east as Massachusetts.

== See also ==
- Other projectile points
