= Cascade point =

Projectile point associated with the Cascade phase

A Cascade point is a projectile point associated with the Cascade phase, an ancient culture of Native Americans that settled in the Pacific Northwest that existed from 9000 or 10000 BC until about 5500 BC.

The Cascade (Bipointed) point is typically narrow, lanceolate leaf shaped, with either a pointed or rounded base. There are also two other variants, one with a shallow concave base and the other with a sharply contracting basal margin.

Cascade points are generally regarded as poor temporal markers because they are found in early, middle, and even late Holocene contexts. It is unclear whether this broad timespan is a function of prolonged use of the point form, later groups recycling discarded artifacts, or a combination of both. The spatial and temporal distribution of foliate points in the northern Great Basin and present new data derived from work at a stratified rockshelter in Oregon's Warner Valley have been reviewed. Foliate projectile points have been uncovered there that meet the original definition and more recent refinements of the Cascade point type associated with a late early Holocene and middle Holocene occupation.

A projectile found lodged in the hip of Kennewick Man was leaf-shaped, long, broad and had serrated edges.

== See also ==
- Other projectile points
