= Susquehanna broad projectile point =

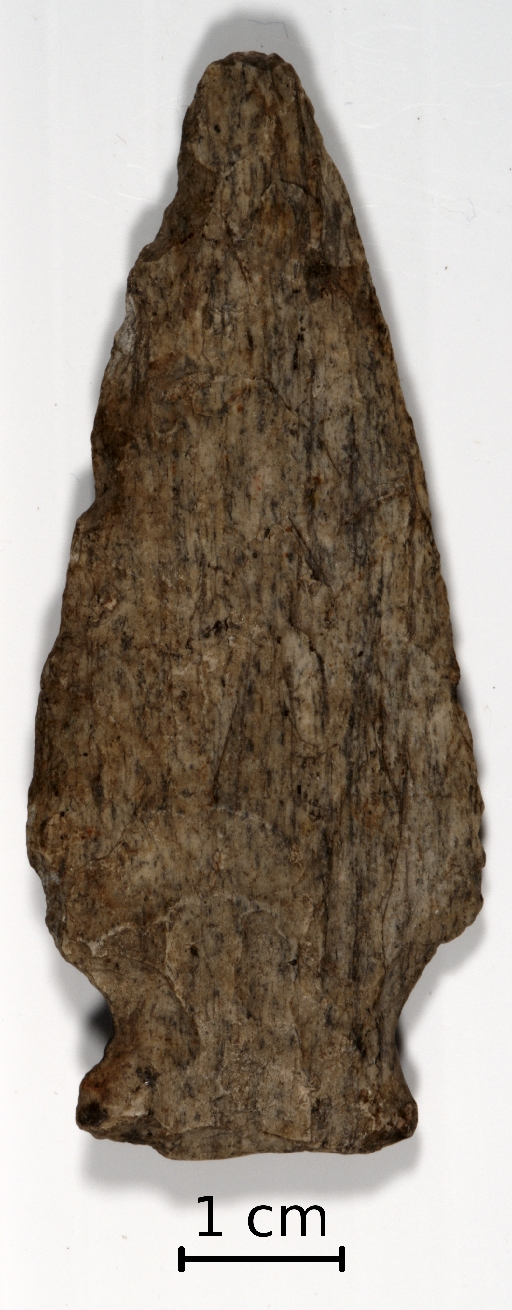
Susquehanna broad projectile point from central New York State. Made from rhyolite, probably quarried near Gettysburg, Pennsylvania.

Susquehanna broad projectile points are stone projectile points manufactured by Native Americans in what is now the Northeastern United States, generally in the time interval of 1200–700 BC. They are probably atlatl dart points, but some are large enough to have been spear points. They derive their name from the specimens throughout the Susquehanna River Valley in the northeastern United States, particularly Pennsylvania and New York.

== Description ==
Susquehanna broad point sizes generally range from 1.5 in (3.8 cm) in length to 4 in (10 cm) with an average of about 1.25 in (3.2 cm) in length. The blade is triangular, the base is narrower than the ears. They are usually about twice as long as they are wide. Many specimens found in Pennsylvania and New York are made from rhyolite coming from outcrops near Gettysburg, Pennsylvania

== Age and cultural affiliations ==
They have mostly been dated to around 1200-700 BC, which is a transitional time between the hunter-gatherer cultures to a more agricultural-based culture.

== Distribution ==
These points are generally found in the area around the Susquehanna River Valley, in New York and Pennsylvania.

== See also ==
- Other projectile points
