= Kimberley points =

Aboriginal stone tool

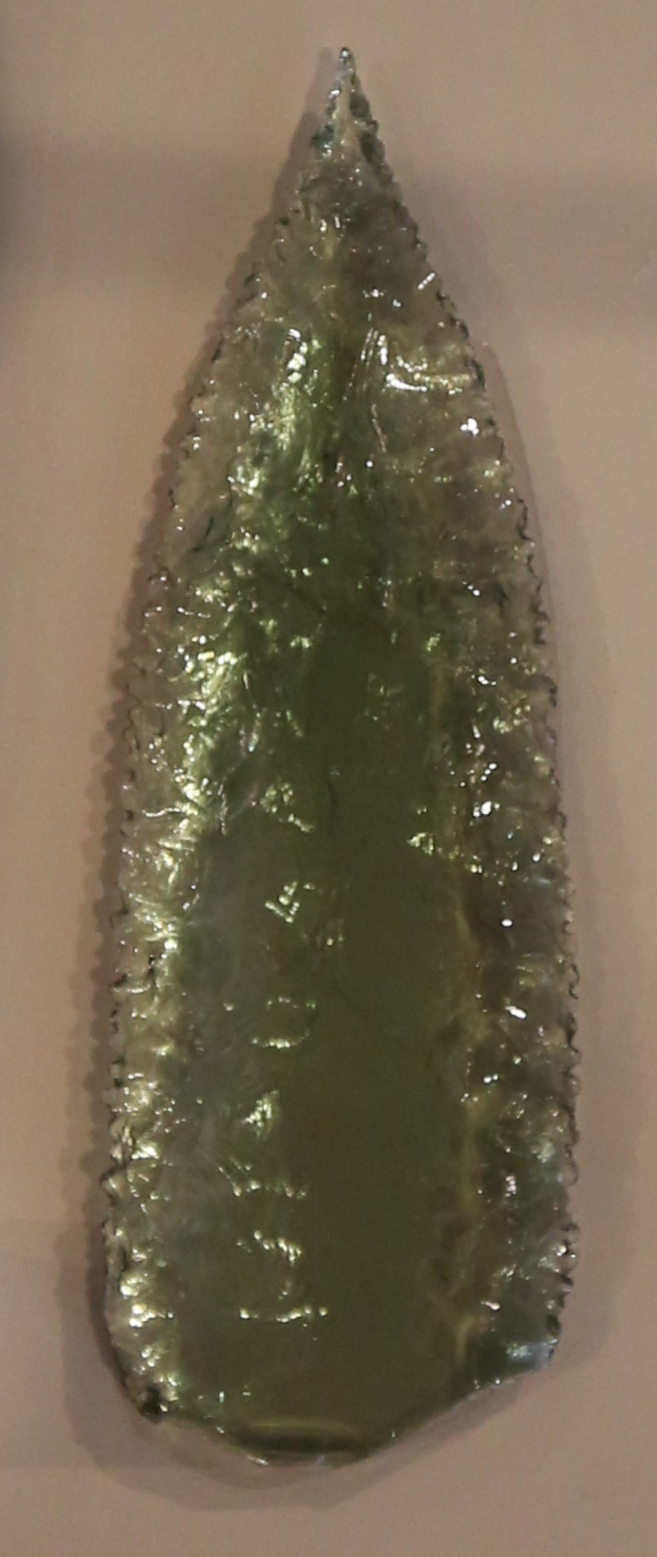
Example of a Kimberley spearhead in the collection of Collection of the National Museum of Scotland

Kimberley points are a type of Aboriginal stone tool made by pressure flaking both discarded glass and stone. Best known for the points made of glass, these artifacts are an example of adaptive reuse of Western technology by a non-western culture.

They are often used as an indicator that an archaeological site is a post-contact Aboriginal site. There is debate in archaeological literature about the use and significance of these points, with some claims that they were made for sale to tourists and as status items, and not as hunting tools.
