= Bare Island projectile point =

Lithic projectile point used in ancient North America

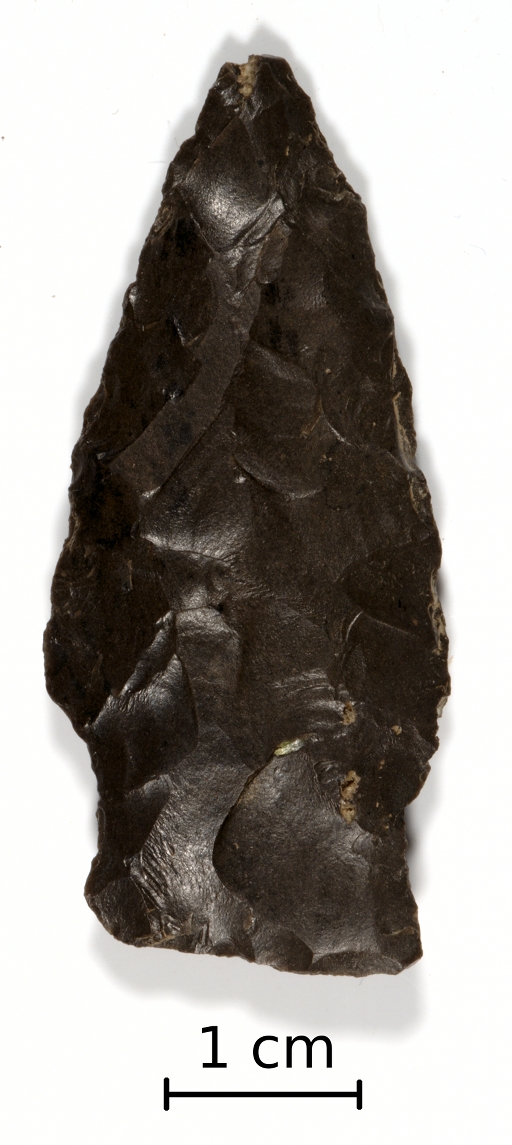
A Bare Island projectile point made of flint from central New York State.

The Bare Island projectile point is a stone projectile point of prehistoric Indigenous peoples of North America. It was named by Fred Kinsey in 1959 for examples recovered at the Kent-Halley site on Bare Island in Pennsylvania.

== Distribution ==
Area of distribution covers most of the upper Eastern Seaboard. The type was used during the late Archaic through Woodland periods. These points are generally found in the Lower Susquehanna River Valley in Maryland, but are also found to the north in New Jersey, and to the northwest in southern and eastern New York and western Pennsylvania.

== Age and cultural affiliations ==
The type was used during the late Archaic through Woodland period. They have mostly been dated to the late Archaic period in North America, 3000-1000 BCE.

== Description ==
The point is a medium to large sized, narrow, thick stemmed projectile or knife with tapered shoulders. One shoulder is higher than the other and the blade is convex to straight. The stem is parallel to expanding. It is similar to the Little Bear Creek point in the southeast.

Bare Island points sizes range from 1.2 in length to 3.8 inches with an average of somewhat over 2 inches in length. They have straight stems and straight bases, and are generally 2 to 3 times longer than they are wide.

== See also ==
- Other projectile points
