= Elko point =

Ancient stone tip for an arrow or similar weapon

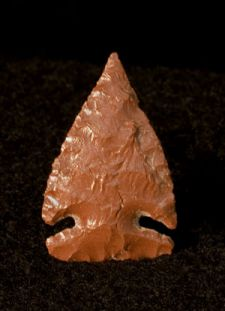
A Corner Notched projectile with flat basal edge.

Elko points, Elko cluster, or Elko eared, are a form of chipped stone projectile points associated with cultures of the Northwestern United States. They are sometimes also called Desert Corner Notched, Eastgate, Elko Corner Notched, Hell's Canyon. They were first discovered in situ in a site near Elko, Nevada by Robert Heizer and M. A. Baumhoff in 1961. Elko arrowheads were used 4,000 to 1,500 years ago, have the classic arrowhead shape and were launched with spears and darts to hunt small mammals and ducks.

== Types ==
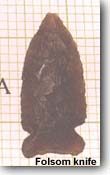
An Elko Side Notch projectile with slightly concave basal edge.

There are three main types of Elko points. The Elko Corner Notched proper, which has a fairly straight basal edge that doesn't quite have the distinctive central basal notch. The Elko Split Stem has a narrow basal notch and the Elko Side Notched.

=== Elko Corner Notched ===
Elko Corner Notched are triangular points with a flattened to slightly elliptical cross section and ranging on average of 33 to 51 mm long. The blade is narrowly serrated with an average point width of 13 to 17 mm. The base is fairly flat to slightly concave with characteristic deep notches at the base having a classic upward angle. Overall, the point has an average thickness of 4 to 9 mm.

=== Elko Side Notch ===
Elko Side Notch points are triangular with a flattened to slightly elliptical cross section and ranging on average of 33 to 51 mm long. The blade is narrowly serrated with an average arrowhead width of 13 to 17 mm. The base is fairly flat to slightly concave with a small notch and stem at the base. Overall, the point has an average thickness of 4 to 9 mm.

=== Elko split stem ===
These are triangular points with a flattened to slightly elliptical cross section and ranging on average of 33 to 51 mm long. The blade is commonly serrated with characteristical side notches having an upward angle with an average width of 18 to 24 mm. The base is slightly concave with a narrow basal notch. Overall, the point has an average thickness of 4 to 9 mm. Split Stem points predate Elko series points to between 5,500 and 3,300 years BP in the Lahontan Basin.
