= Eden point =

American Archaic period stone projectile

Eden Points are a form of chipped stone projectile points associated with a sub-group of the larger Plano culture. Sometimes also called Yuma points, the first Eden points were discovered in washouts in Yuma County, Colorado. They were first discovered in situ at an ancient buffalo kill site near Eden, Wyoming, by Harold J. Cook in 1941. Named after archaeologist O. M. Finley, the Finley Site eventually yielded 24 projectile points, including eight Eden points, eight Scottsbluff points and one complete Cody point, both other sub-groups within the Plano group. Eden points are believed to have been used between 10,000 and 6,000 years ago by paleo-indian hunters in the western plains.

Eden points have been discovered across the western plain states, including Wyoming, Colorado, Nebraska, and Montana.

== See also ==
- Other projectile points
