= Running Water Draw =

Coordinates: 33.9780°N 101.4912°W

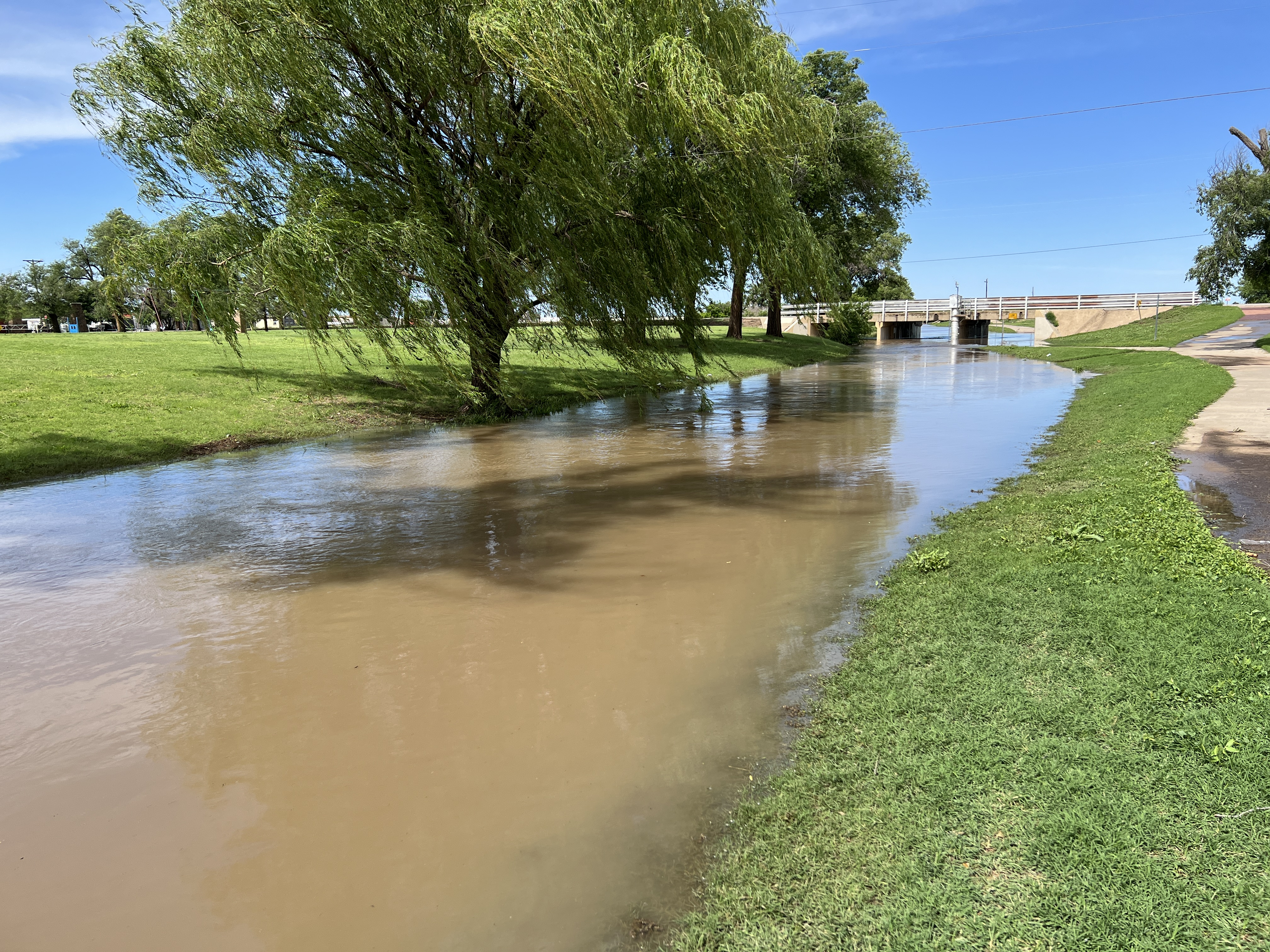
- Running Water Draw flowing through Broadway Park in Plainview, Texas

Location
- Country: United States

Physical characteristics
- Source
  - location: Curry County, New Mexico
  - elevation: 4,565 ft (1,391 m)
- Mouth
  - location: Floyd County, Texas
  - elevation: 3,100 ft (940 m)
- Length: 150 mi (240 km)
- Basin size: 1,620 mi^{2} (4,200 km^{2})

Running Water Draw is an ephemeral watercourse about 150 mi (240 km) long, heading about 24 mi (39 km) west-northwest of Clovis, New Mexico, and trending generally east-southeast, into Texas, to join Callahan Draw at the head of the White River about 9 mi (14 km) west of Floydada and 34 mi (55 km) northeast of Lubbock.

Running Water Draw drains an area of 1,620 sq mi (4,200 km^{2}) as it extends across Curry County, New Mexico, and Parmer, Castro, Lamb, Hale, and Floyd counties of West Texas.

== See also ==
- Blanco Canyon
- Salt Fork Brazos River
- List of rivers of Texas
