= Hafting =

Process by which an artifact is attached to a haft

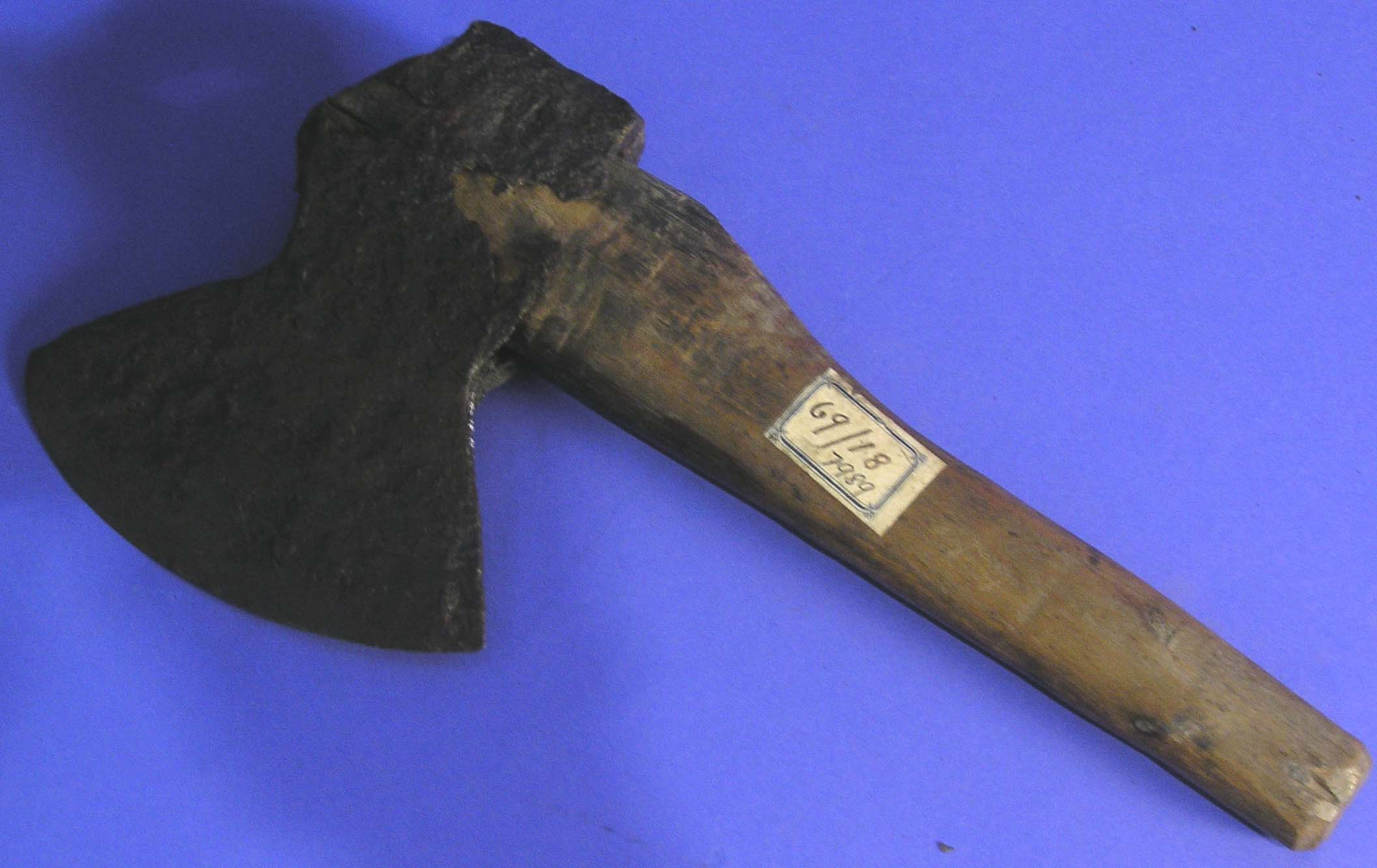
An axe hafted with an adhesive

Hafting is a process by which an artifact, often made of bone, stone, or metal is attached to a haft (handle or strap). This makes the artifact more useful by allowing it to be launched by a bow (arrow), thrown by hand (spear), or used with more effective leverage (axe). When constructed properly, hafting can tremendously improve a weapon's damage and range. It is estimated that hafted weapons were most common during the Upper Paleolithic and Middle Paleolithic. It is one of the earliest examples of hominins combining separate elements into a single tool. The development of hafting is considered by archaeologists to have been a significant milestone. It was not only an improvement in technology at the time, but also a sign of the human mind's progression toward a world of complex tool-making.

Hafting weapons is perhaps best known for its use by humans in prehistory, but it is still practiced by enthusiasts today, and the handle of a tool such as an axe is still known as a haft. Many people still practice hafting using old-fashioned methods to determine the best way to attach a handle to tools, while improving the overall structure and function. Hafting has evolved, and the concept is still evident in the design of modern tools such as hammers and axes. The methods and processes of hafting have also varied and evolved.

== The hafting process ==
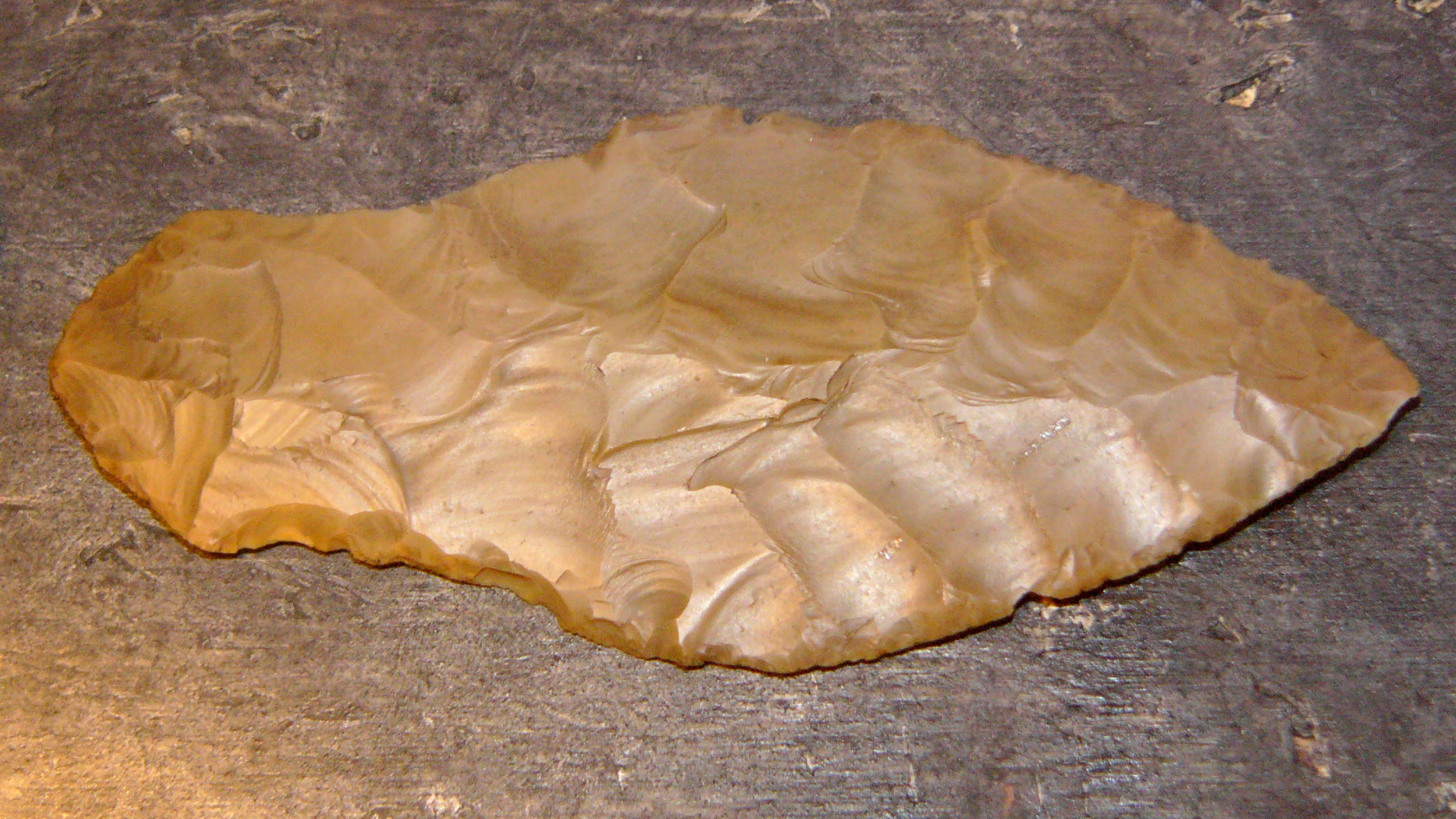
Flint (tool)

Hafting requires a means of attaching the artifact to the strap or shaft, and to this end, flanges are often created on one end (the end opposite the cutting edge). Flanges are produced by a process of knapping or grinding the excess stone away, resulting in indentations in the piece.

If a shaft or handle is to be used, it must also be prepared. Wood is frequently used. A good piece of wood has a diameter large enough to provide adequate strength yet small enough to hold comfortably for long periods. A common practice of hafting is to remove the outer layer of bark where the handhold would be to prevent cuts and the painful imperfections found in the bark. Attaching the tool to the shaft can be difficult, which is why two main methods are used to soften the wooden shaft: burning the end and/or soaking it in water. These soften the material to easily allow the slits to be cut vertically into the center of the shaft. This provides a place for the "head" of the tool or weapon to fit. Alternatively, the shaft may be split down the center, allowing the artifact to sit fully within it; once fully wrapped up, it can be much stronger.

The artifact can then be inserted into the slit and fixed to the shaft by tying around the flanges with a suitable material. Materials such as Australian Sea Grass Cordage and split deer intestine can be used for their high strength and durability once installed. Some people will wrap the material around the handle as well to add grip. The main disadvantage of wrapping the tool onto the shaft becomes apparent after use, when the fibers lose tension and become loose. High humidity is also a contributing factor to the fibers losing tension. On occasion, glue is added for extra support. When glue or any other resin is used, the hafting is said to be masticated. Mastic hafts are also very strong and reliable since there is little to no movement of the tool. Glue also has the advantage of absorbing shock when hardened, which helps with cushioning. Before industrial glue was readily available, people would use a variety of plant or animal materials to make glue. Many prehistoric types of glue were a combination of materials, such as animal feces, tree bark, and charcoal. The main downside of mastic hafts is their time-consuming, difficult construction process. Alternatively, the head may be forced into the shaft if the shaft is soft enough, eliminating the need for a slit (and perhaps improving durability). If a strap is used, it is tied directly to the artifact's flanges.

Generally, it takes much longer to create the actual haft binding than to use the tool in the haft. The tool, such as a projectile point, typically takes up to twenty minutes, whereas the haft binding takes several hours. Throughout a haft's life cycle, the tool will often be replaced or sharpened and reattached to the shaft to keep the haft as effective and precise as possible.

== Hafting in prehistory ==
More than 125,000 years ago, early Archaic humans such as Homo heidelbergensis developed the extensive use of hafted stone tools. Over time, hafting evolved, and tools became deadlier with more control. Evolution has brought us from small, dull stone tools to longer, stronger shafts with sharper, narrower tools better suited for piercing and cutting. By offsetting the diameters of a tool with a cylindrical base and a hole in the shaft, a much more secure fit can be made, assuring the ax head stays in place. Hafting stone points, in particular, was an important advancement in the weapons of early humans. These hafted stone points increased the force and effectiveness of these tools, therefore, allowing people to hunt and kill animals more efficiently. The increased efficiency of hunting and killing animals is believed to have allowed people of this time to have regular access to meat and other high-quality foods. The increase in meat consumption around this time could be directly linked to the reported increases in brain size in the archaeological record.

Multiple lines of evidence indicate that ~500,000-year-old stone points from the archaeological site of Kathu Pan 1 (KP1) in South Africa functioned as spear tips. This has led teams of researchers to conclude that the common ancestors of Homo sapiens and Neanderthals began hafting almost 500,000 years ago.

Aboriginal re-hafting workshops have potentially been identified at Lake George, New South Wales, dating back to the Late Holocene.

== See also ==
- Knapping
- Projectile point
