= Alternatives to the Clovis First theory =

Alternative theories on the peopling of the Americas

The theory known as Clovis First was the predominant hypothesis among archaeologists in the second half of the 20th century to explain the peopling of the Americas. According to Clovis First, the people associated with the Clovis culture were the first inhabitants of the Americas. This hypothesis came to be challenged by ongoing studies that suggest pre-Clovis human occupation of the Americas. In 2011, following the excavation of an occupation site at Buttermilk Creek, Texas, a group of scientists identified the existence "of an occupation older than Clovis." At the site in Buttermilk, archaeologists discovered evidence of hunter-gatherer group living and the making of projectile spear points, blades, choppers, and other stone tools. The tools found were made from a local chert and could be dated back to as early as 15,000 years ago.

The primary support for this claim was that no solid evidence of pre-Clovis human habitation had been found. According to the standard accepted theory, the Clovis people crossed the Beringia land bridge over the Bering Strait from Siberia to Alaska during the ice age when there was a period of lowered sea levels, then made their way southward through an ice-free corridor east of the Rocky Mountains, located in present-day Western Canada, as the glaciers retreated.

According to researchers Michael Waters and Thomas Stafford of Texas A&M University, new radiocarbon dates place Clovis remains from the continental United States in a shorter time window beginning 450 years later than the previously accepted threshold (13,200 to 12,900 BP).

Numerous claims of earlier human presence began to challenge the Clovis first model beginning in the 1990s. Scholars such as David J. Meltzer have emphasized the fact that there are no verified archaeological sites in the Americas older than 16,000 years accepted by the academic community at large, which questions claims of sites being 20,000, 25,000, or even 130,000 years old.

== Alternatives to Clovis First ==
=== Evidence of human habitation before Clovis ===
Map of the Americas showing pre-Clovis settlements

There have been a great number of archaeological findings across the Americas that pre-date the arrival of humans prior to 11,500–11,000 uncalibrated years before present (YBP). The Buttermilk Creek Complex, located in Salado, Texas, is a site where over 15,000 artifacts have been found. These artifacts are composed of a variety of small stone tool assemblages. These artifacts stratigraphically underlie previously excavated Clovis assemblages, meaning that they were deposited prior to the Clovis artifacts. These pre-Clovis assemblages are dated to between 13,200 and 15,500 years ago.

Predecessors of the Clovis people may have migrated south along the North American coastlines, although arguments exist for many migrations along several different routes. Radiocarbon dating of the Monte Verde site in Chile places Clovis-like culture there as early as 18,500 to 14,500 years ago. Remains found at the Channel Islands of California place coastal Paleoindians there 12,500 years ago. This suggests that the Paleoindian migration could have spread more quickly along the Pacific coastline, proceeding south, and that populations that settled along that route could have then begun migrations eastward into the continent.

The Pedra Furada sites in Brazil include a collection of rock shelters, which were used for thousands of years by diverse human populations. The first excavations yielded artifacts with carbon-14 dates of 48,000 to 32,000 years BP. Repeated analyses have confirmed this dating, carrying the range of dates up to 60,000 BP. Among the best analyzed archaeological levels are those dated between 32,160 ± 1000 years BP and 17,000 ± 400 BP. These claims have become an issue of contention between North American archaeologists and their South American and European counterparts, who disagree on whether it is conclusively proven to be an older human site.

In 2004, worked stone tools were found at Topper in South Carolina that have been dated by radiocarbon techniques possibly to 50,000 years ago. But, there is significant scholarly dispute regarding these dates. Scholars agree that evidence of humans at the Topper Site date back to 22,900 cal yr BP.

A more substantiated claim is that of Paisley Caves in Oregon, where rigorous carbon-14 and genetic testing appear to indicate that humans related to modern Native Americans were present in the caves over 1000 ^{14}C years before the earliest evidence of Clovis. Traces and tools made by another people, the Western Stemmed Tradition, were documented.

A study published in Science presents strong evidence that humans occupied sites in Monte Verde in Chile, at the southern tip of South America, as early as 13,000 years ago. If this is true, then humans may have entered North America long before the Clovis culture, perhaps as long as 16,000 years ago.

The Tlapacoya site in Mexico is on the base of a remnant volcanic hill on the shore of the former Lake Chalco. Seventeen excavations along the base of Tlapacoya Hill between 1956 and 1973 uncovered piles of disarticulated bones of bear and deer that appeared to have been butchered, plus 2,500 flakes and blades presumably from the butchering activities, plus one unfluted spear point. All were found in the same stratum containing three circular hearths filled with charcoal and ash. Bones of many other animal species were also present, including horses and migratory waterfowl. Two uncalibrated radiocarbon dates on carbon from the hearths came in around 24,000 and 22,000 years ago. At another location, a prismatic microblade of obsidian was found in association with a tree trunk radiocarbon dated (uncalibrated) at roughly 24,000 years ago. This obsidian blade has recently been hydration dated by Joaquín García-Bárcena to 22,000 years ago. The hydration results were published in a seminal article that deals with the evidence for pre-Clovis habitation of Mexico.

Other sites, like White Sands National Park in New Mexico, also demonstrate archaeological findings that predate Clovis populations. In White Sands, excavated surfaces uncovered multiple in situ human footprints that were stratigraphically located between layers of material that were radio carbon dated to be from between 21,000 and 23,000 years ago. The findings from this site predate previous theories about the timeline of human migration of the Americas by several thousand years. Archaeologist working on the site believe that their findings indicates that humans had been present in the region since 23,000 years prior. This would mean that humans were occupying North America during the Last Glacial Maximum (LGM) – a theory that had previously been dismissed.

Though it is not currently the widely accepted theory, these archaeological sites support alternative theories of early human migration such as a coastal migration route or the Solutrean hypothesis. This archaeological evidence is also supported by genetic mapping of ancestral mitochondrial DNA.

Archaeological sites that predate Clovis that are well documented include:

- White Sands National Park, New Mexico, USA; (21,000–23,000 BP)
- Topper, South Carolina, US (16,000–20,000 yr BP; possibly 50,000 yr BP)
- Saltville (archaeological site), Virginia, US (14,510 ^{14}C yr BP)
- Manis Mastodon site, Sequim, Washington, US (13,800 yr BP)
- Connley Caves, Oregon, US (13,000 yr BP)
- Lapa do Boquete, Brazil (12,070 ±170 ^{14}C yr BP)
- Tanana Valley, Alaska, US (13,000–14,000 cal yr BP)
- El Abra, Colombia (12,460 ±140 ^{14}C yr BP)
- Nenana Valley, Alaska, US (12,000 yr BP)
- Tibitó, Colombia (11,740 ±110 ^{14}C yr BP)
- Tagua-Tagua, Chile (11,380 ±380 ^{14}C yr BP)

=== Coastal migration route ===
Studies of the mitochondrial DNA of First Nations/Native Americans published in 2007 suggest that the people of the New World may have diverged genetically from Siberians as early as 20,000 years ago, far earlier than the standard theory suggests. According to one alternative theory, the Pacific coast of North America may have been free of ice, allowing the first peoples in North America to come down this route prior to the formation of the ice-free corridor in the continental interior. No evidence has yet been found to support this hypothesis except that genetic analysis of coastal marine life indicates diverse fauna persisting in refugia throughout the Pleistocene ice ages along the coasts of Alaska and British Columbia; these refugia include common food sources of coastal aboriginal peoples, suggesting that a migration along the coastline was feasible at the time. Some early sites on the coast, for example Namu, British Columbia, exhibit maritime focus on foods from an early point with substantial cultural continuity.

This lack of evidence is likely due to the change in sea level since the time of migration. During the Last Glacial Maximum the global sea level was more than 400 feet lower than it is today. Starting about 15,000 years ago, glaciers began retreating and sea levels began rising. Sea levels reached their current level about 8,000 years ago and have fluctuated slightly since then. This drastic change in sea level may prevent the discovery of sites located along what was once the coastline and is now located under over 400 feet of water. As of now, genetic analysis is one of the only means of tracking early human movements.

In February 2014, researchers reported on their DNA analysis of the remains of Anzick boy (referred to as Anzick-1) of Montana, the oldest skeleton found in the Americas and dated to 12,600 years ago. They found the mtDNA to be D4h3a, "one of the rare lineages associated with Native Americans." This was the same as the mtDNA associated with current coastal populations in North and South America. The study team suggest that finding this genetic evidence so far inland shows that "current distribution of genetic markers are not necessarily indicative of the movement or distribution of peoples in the past." The Y haplotype was found to be Q-L54*(xM3). Further testing found that Anzick-1 was most closely related to Native American populations (see below).

=== Solutrean hypothesis ===
The controversial Solutrean hypothesis proposed in 1999 by Smithsonian archaeologist Dennis Stanford and colleague Bruce Bradley, suggests that the Clovis people could have inherited technology from the Solutrean people who lived in southern Europe 21,000–15,000 years ago, and who created the first Stone Age artwork in present-day southern France. The link is suggested by the similarity in technology between the projectile points of the Solutreans and those found at Clovis (and pre-Clovis) sites. Its proponents point to tools found at various pre-Clovis sites in eastern North America (particularly in the Chesapeake Bay region) as progenitors of Clovis-style tools. The model envisions these people making the crossing in small watercraft via the edge of the pack ice in the North Atlantic Ocean that then extended to the Atlantic coast of France, using skills similar to those of the modern Inuit, making landfall somewhere around the then-exposed Grand Banks of the North American continental shelf.

In a 2008 study of the relevant paleoceanographic data, Kieran Westley and Justin Dix concluded that "it is clear from the paleoceanographic and paleo-environmental data that the Last Glacial Maximum (LGM) North Atlantic does not fit the descriptions provided by the proponents of the Solutrean Atlantic Hypothesis. Although ice use and sea mammal hunting may have been important in other contexts, in this instance, the conditions militate against an ice-edge-following, maritime-adapted European population reaching the Americas."

University of New Mexico anthropologist Lawrence G. Straus, a primary critic of the Solutrean hypothesis, points to the theoretical difficulty of the ocean crossing, a lack of Solutrean-specific features in pre-Clovis artifacts, as well as the lack of art (such as that found at Lascaux in France) among the Clovis people, as major deficiencies in the Solutrean hypothesis. The 3,000 to 5,000 radiocarbon year gap between the Solutrean period of France and Spain and the Clovis of the New World also makes such a connection problematic. In response, Bradley and Stanford contend that it was "a very specific subset of the Solutrean who formed the parent group that adapted to a maritime environment and eventually made it across the north Atlantic ice-front to colonize the east coast of the Americas" and that this group may not have shared all Solutrean cultural traits.

=== Genetic evidence of east/west dichotomy ===
Mitochondrial DNA analysis in 2014 found that members of some native North American tribes have a maternal ancestry (called haplogroup X) linked to the maternal ancestors of some present-day individuals in western Asia and Europe, albeit distantly. This has also provided some support for pre-Clovis models. More specifically, a variant of mitochondrial DNA called X2a found in many Native Americans has been traced to western Eurasia, while not being found in eastern Eurasia.

Mitochondrial DNA analysis of Anzick-1 concluded that the boy belonged to what is known as haplogroup or lineage D4h3a. This finding is important because the D4h3a line is considered to be a lineage "founder", belonging to the first people to reach the Americas. Although rare in most of today's Native Americans in the US and Canada, D4h3a genes are more common among native peoples of South America, far from the site in Montana where Anzick-1 was buried. This suggests a greater genetic complexity among Native Americans than previously thought, including an early divergence in the genetic lineage 13,000 years ago. One theory suggests that after crossing into North America from Siberia, a group of the first Americans, with the lineage D4h3a, moved south along the Pacific coast and, over thousands of years, into Central and South America, while others may have moved inland, east of the Rocky Mountains. The apparent early divergence between North American and Central plus South American populations may or may not be associated with post-divergence gene flow from a more basal population into North America; however, analysis of published DNA sequences for 19 Siberian populations does not favor the latter scenario.

Spearheads and DNA found at the Paisley Caves site in Oregon suggest that North America was colonized by more than one culture, and that the Clovis culture was not the first. There is evidence to suggest an east/west dichotomy, with the Clovis culture located to the east.

But in 2014, the autosomal DNA of a 12,500+-year-old infant from Montana was sequenced. The DNA was taken from a skeleton referred to as Anzick-1, found in close association with several Clovis artifacts. Comparisons indicate strong affinities with DNA from Siberian sites, and virtually rule out close affinity with European sources (the "Solutrean hypothesis"). The DNA shows strong affinities with all existing Native American populations, which indicated that each of them derives from an ancient population that lived in or near Siberia, the Upper Palaeolithic Mal'ta population. Mal'ta belonged to Y-DNA haplogroup R and mitochrondrial macrohaplogroup U.

The data indicate that Anzick-1 is from a population directly ancestral to present South American and Central American Native American populations. This rules out hypotheses which posit that invasions subsequent to the Clovis culture overwhelmed or assimilated previous migrants into the Americas. Anzick-1 is less closely related to present North American Native American populations (including a Yaqui genetic sample), suggesting that the North American populations are basal to Anzick-1 and Central and South American populations. The apparent early divergence between North American and Central plus South American populations might be due to post-divergence gene flow from a more basal population into North America; however, analysis of published DNA sequences of 19 Siberian populations do not suggest this scenario. Anzick-1 belonged to Y-haplogroup Q-L54(xM3), which is by far the largest haplogroup among Native Americans.

The issue is complicated by the discovery that there was DNA backflow from North America to North Asia during the period in question.

=== Megafaunal migrations ===
Although there is no archaeological evidence that can be used to directly support a coastal migration route during the Last Glacial Maximum, genetic analysis has been used to support this thesis. In addition to human genetic lineage, megafaunal DNA lineage can be used to trace movements of megafauna – large mammalian – as well as the early human groups who hunted them.

Bison, a type of megafauna, have been identified as an ideal candidate for the tracing of human migrations out of Europe because of both their abundance in North America as well as being one of the first megafauna for which ancient DNA was used to trace patterns of population movement. Unlike other types of fauna that moved between the Americas and Eurasia (mammoths, horses, and lions), Bison survived the North American extinction event that occurred at the end of the Pleistocene. Their genome, however, contains evidence of a bottleneck – something that can be used to test hypothesis on migrations between the two continents. Early human groups were largely nomadic, relying on following food sources for survival. Mobility was part of what made humans successful. As nomadic groups, early humans likely followed the food from Eurasia to the Americas – part of the reason why tracing megafaunal DNA is so helpful for garnering insight to these migratory patterns.

The grey wolf originated in the Americas and migrated into Eurasia prior to the Last Glacial Maximum – during which it was believed that remaining populations of the grey wolf residing in North America faced extinction and were isolated from the rest of the population. This, however, may not be the case. Radiocarbon dating of ancient grey wolf remains found in permafrost deposits in Alaska show a continuous exchange of population from 12,500 radiocarbon years BP to beyond radiocarbon dating capabilities. This indicates that there was viable passage for grey wolf populations to exchange between the two continents.

These faunas' ability to exchange populations during the period of the Last Glacial Maximum along with genetic evidence found from early human remains in the Americas provides evidence to support pre-Clovis migrations into the Americas.

== Other sites ==
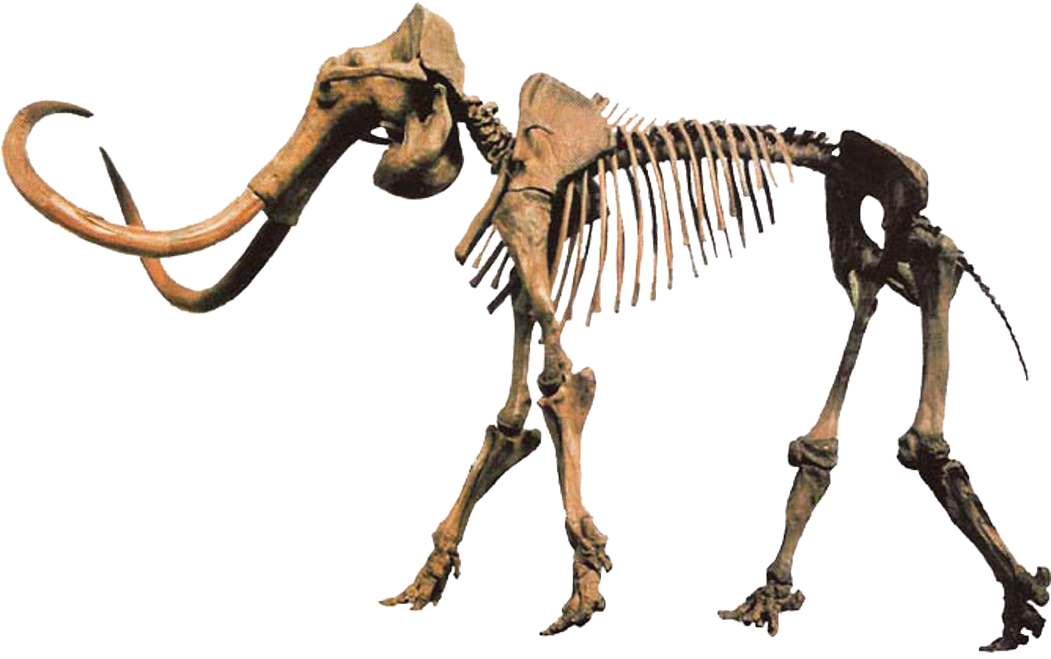
Woolly mammoth (Mammuthus primigenius), a bearing tool cast skeleton produced and distributed by Triebold Paleontology Incorporated in Woodland Park, Colorado

Other sites include (in approximate reverse chronological order):

- Pedra Furada, Serra da Capivara National Park in Piauí, Brazil. Site with evidence of non-Clovis human remains, a rock painting rupestre art drawings from at least 12,000–6,000 BP. Hearth samples C-14 dates of 48–32,000 BP were reported in a Nature article (Guidon and Delibrias 1986). New hearth samples with ABOX dates of 54,000 BP were reported in the Quaternary Science Reviews. Paleoindian components found here, have been challenged by American researchers such as David J. Meltzer, James M. Adovasio, and Tom Dillehay.
- The Monte Verde site in Chile, was occupied from 14,800 years BP, with bones and other finds dating on average 14,500 yrs BP. The earliest finds at the site were from between 32,840 and 33,900 years BP, but are controversial. ^{14}C yr BP)
- The Bluefish Caves site in Yukon, Canada, contains bones with evidence of human cut-marks which demonstrates a human presence as early as 24,000 yr BP. The Bluefish caves are currently the oldest archaeological site in North America and offers evidence regarding the Beringia Standstill hypothesis, which states a genetically isolated human population remained in the area during the last glacial maximum and then traveled within North America and South America after the glaciers receded.
- Lagoa Santa, in Minas Gerais in Brazil, is erroneously asserted to be Clovis age or even possibly Pre-Clovis in age. The recent discussion of this site (specifically Lapa Vermelha IV) and the Luzia skull, reportedly 11,500 years old by Neves and Hubb, makes it clear that this date is a chronological date in years Before Present and not a raw radiocarbon date in eastern Brazil. Clovis sites mostly date between 11,500 and 11,000 radiocarbon years which means 13,000 years before present at a minimum. "Luzia" is at least 1,000 years younger than Clovis and Lapa Vermelha IV should not be considered a Pre-Clovis site.
- Cueva del Milodón, in Patagonian Chile dates at least as early as 10,500 BP. This is a site found particularly early in the New World hunt for Early Man, circa 1896, and needs additional basic research, but 10,500 B.P. would be 1,500 years younger than Clovis, or if the dating is 10,500 RCYBP [radiocarbon years before present], it would still be roughly 500–700 years younger than Clovis. In either case this should not be considered a Pre-Clovis site.
- Cueva Fell and Pali Aike Crater sites in Patagonia, with hearths, stone tools and other elements of human habitation dating to at least as early as 11,000 BP.
- The Big Eddy Site in southwestern Missouri contains several claimed pre-Clovis artifacts or geofacts. In situ artifacts have been found in this well-stratified site in association with charcoal. Five different samples have been AMS dated to between 11,300 and 12,675 BP (Before Present).
- Taima Taima, Venezuela has cultural material very similar to Monte Verde II, dating to 12,000 years BP. Recovered artifacts of the El Jobo complex in direct association with the butchered remains of a juvenile mastodon. Radiocarbon dates on associated wood twigs indicate a minimum age of 13,000 years before the present for the mastodon kill, a dating significantly older than that of the Clovis complex in North America.
- The Page–Ladson site, on the Aucilla River in Florida, has yielded evidence that a mastodon was butchered by people 15,550 calendar years BP. A cut mastodon tusk dated to 12,300 years BP had previously been found near a few in situ artifacts of similar age. A test pit in 1983 yielded elephant bones, bone tools, and chips from tool making. Radiocarbon dating of organic material from the pit yielded dates from 13,000 to 11,700 years BP.
- The Schaefer and Hebior mammoth sites in Kenosha County, Wisconsin indicate exploitation of this animal by humans. The Schaefer Mammoth site has over 13 highly purified collagen AMS dates and 17 dates on associated wood, dating it to 12,300–12,500 radiocarbon years before the present. Hebior has two AMS dates in the same range. Both animals show conclusive butchering marks and associated non-diagnostic tools.
- A site in Walker, Minnesota with stone tools, alleged to be from 13,000 to 15,000 years old based on surrounding geology, was discovered in 2006. However, further examination suggests that the site does not represent a human occupation.
- In a 2011 article in Science, Waters et al. 2011 describe an assemblage of 15,528 lithic artifacts from the Debra L. Friedkin site west of Salado, Texas. These artifacts (including 56 tools, 2,268 macrodebitage and 13,204 microdebitage) define the Buttermilk Creek Complex formation, which stratigraphically underlies a Clovis assemblage. While carbon dating could not be used to directly date the artifacts, 49 samples from the 20 cm Buttermilk floodplain sedimentary clay layer in which the artifacts were embedded were dated using optically stimulated luminescence (OSL). Eighteen OSL ages, ranging from 14,000 to 17,500 ka were obtained from this layer. The authors report "the most conservative estimate" of the age of the Buttermilk clays range from 13,200 to 15,500 ka, based on the minimum age represented by each of the 18 OSL ages.
- Human coprolites have been found in Paisley Caves in Oregon, carbon dated at 14,300 years ago. Genetic analysis revealed that the coprolites contained mtDNA haplogroups A2 and B2, two of the five major Native American mtDNA haplogroups.
- The Mud Lake site, in Kenosha County, Wisconsin, consists of the foreleg of a juvenile mammoth recovered in the 1930s. Over 100 stone tool butchering marks are found on the bones. Several purified collagen AMS dates show the animal to be 13,450 RCYBP with a range of plus or minus 1,500 RCYBP variance.
- Meadowcroft Rockshelter in southwestern Pennsylvania, excavated between 1973 and 78, has evidence of occupancy dating back from 16,000 to 19,000 years ago.
- Cactus Hill in southern Virginia, with artifacts such as unfluted bifacial stone tools with dates ranging from c. 15,000 to 17,000 years ago.
- Sixty-eight stone and bone tools discovered in an orchard in East Wenatchee, Washington in 1987, excavated in 1988 and 1990. Five of the Clovis points are on display at the Wenatchee Valley Museum & Cultural Center.
- Serpentine Hot Springs in the Seward Peninsula in Alaska, excavated 2010–2011, with evidence of what appears to have been a backflow in migration of Clovis people who may have moved north through the ice-free corridor to settle in Western Alaska on the Bering Sea. The spear points found were a modification of Clovis, either from a northward migration or of the adoption of the technology by indigenous inhabitants.
- Pendejo Cave is a geological feature and archaeological site located in southern New Mexico. Archaeologist Richard S. MacNeish claimed that human occupation of the cave pre-dates by tens of thousands of years the Clovis Culture.
- The Cerutti Mastodon site is a paleontological and possible archeological site in San Diego County, California. In 2017, researchers announced that broken mastodon bones at the site had been dated to around 130,700 years ago. Others have disputed the claim that humans had modified the cobbles found at the site or had broken the bones.

== See also ==
- Archaeology of the Americas
- First Nations
- History of Mesoamerica (Paleo-Indian)
- List of archaeological periods (Mesoamerica)
- List of archaeological periods (North America)
- Naco-Mammoth Kill Site
- Cooper's Ferry site
