= Buttermilk Creek complex =

Early archaeological site in Texas, United States

- Location within Texas Location within the United States
- Interactive map of Buttermilk Creek complex
- 30°53′32″N 97°42′35″W
- Location: Bell County, Texas, United States
- Nearest city: Salado and Belton

Site notes
- Elevation: 183 metres (600 ft)

The Buttermilk Creek complex is the remains of a Paleolithic settlement along the shores of Buttermilk Creek in present-day Salado, Texas. The assemblage dates to ~13.2 to 15.5 thousand years old. If confirmed, the site represents evidence of human settlement in the Americas that predates the Clovis culture.

== Introduction ==
The Buttermilk Creek complex found at the Debra L. Friedkin Paleo-Indian archaeological site in Bell County, Texas, has provided archaeological evidence of a human presence in the Americas that pre-dates the Clovis peoples, who until recently were thought to be the first humans to explore and settle North America. The site's pre-Clovis occupation is supported by numerous lines of evidence including optically stimulated luminescence (OSL) dates ranging from 13,200-15,500 before present, undisturbed stratigraphy, and an extensive stone tool assemblage. OSL is a technique that analyzes light energy trapped in sediment particles to identify the last time the soil was exposed to sunlight.

== Background ==
Michael R. Waters from Texas A&M University along with a group of graduate and undergraduate students began excavating the Debra L. Friedkin Site in Bell County, Texas in 2006. The site is located 250 metres (820 ft) downstream along Buttermilk Creek from the Gault site; a Paleo-Indian site excavated in 1998 and found to have deeply stratified deposits including a Clovis horizon.

Early humans would have been attracted to the area surrounding Buttermilk Creek due its favorable climate, abundance of food resources, a year-round water source, but most importantly because the area was a source of very high quality Edwards chert stone. They would have made tools out of chert nodules using a technique called flint knapping which employs the striking of hammer stones and antler billets to remove flakes of chert until the nodules are reduced to bifacial shape.

They would have then used smaller antlers to pressure flake these items into spear points, knives, or other tools. Along with bifacial tools they also produced unifacial tools such as blades and bladelets by skillfully working and setting up a platform on blade core and then striking it with an antler billet to remove a blade.

== Clovis first model ==
Beginning in the mid 20th century the consensus among archaeologists was that the first human colonizers of the New World were the Clovis people who migrated from Siberia across Beringia and down into the Americas from 13,200-12,800 BP. It is believed that Clovis peoples with their characteristic fluted lanceolate-shaped points quickly spread throughout all of North and South America.

This theory for the colonization of the New World is known as the "Clovis First" model and has recently come under question by the discovery and acceptance of the Monte Verde, Chile site which has radio-carbon dates going back to 14,600 BP calibrated. This was the first site widely accepted to have pre-Clovis deposits.

The acceptance of Monte Verde has led to a reevaluation of the "Clovis First" model and helped to lead the way for the acceptance of other pre-Clovis sites. Until the discovery of the Buttermilk Creek complex, which appears to have unquestionable evidence of pre-Clovis habitation, there has been a lack of indisputable evidence of pre-Clovis culture in North America.

There are several known sites in the US with possible pre-Clovis remains including:

- Meadowcroft Rock Shelter (Pennsylvania)
- Topper (South Carolina)
- Page-Ladson (Florida)
- Cactus Hill (Virginia)
- The Schaefer and Hebior mammoth sites in Kenosha County, Wisconsin
- Lovewell (Kansas), at Lovewell Reservoir
- La Sena (Nebraska), and
- Paisley Caves (Oregon).

Although all of these sites have evidence for pre-Clovis occupations, controversy has surrounded some of them or their findings have yet to be thoroughly published, which has kept them from being widely accepted as pre-Clovis sites.

At the Debra L. Friedkin site multiple lines of evidence support its pre-Clovis assignment. The discovery of the Buttermilk Creek complex has helped archaeologists further their quest to identify who the first humans were to reach the New World, when and how they arrived here and where their point of origin was.

== Excavations ==
Excavations at the Debra L. Friedkin site include Block A located on terrace 2 and Block B on terrace 1. The two terraces are Pleistocene floodplain deposits.

The pre-Clovis occupation is found within Block A, which consists of 52 adjacent 1 metre (3 ft 3 in) x 1 metre (3 ft 3 in) squares. Block A is buried under colluvium from a nearby slope and 1.4 metres (4 ft 7 in) of clay sediment deposited gradually during flooding events from nearby Buttermilk Creek.

The Buttermilk Creek complex is found within vertisols. The stratigraphy of block A appears to be undisturbed and non-mixed based on multiple lines of evidence including: the lack of artifact sorting by size from the top to bottom of Block A, pedogenesis forming calcium carbonate present only on artifacts in the deepest layers of Block A, and proper chronological ordering of numerous OSL dates.

Block A consists of 9 soil horizons. The findings of the excavations were analyzed and interpreted using a holistic approach that featured researchers from many different fields including: Steven L. Forman and James Pierson who are experts in OSL dating; Lee C. Nordt, Steven G. Driese, Joshua M. Feinberg, and Anna Lindquist-who are all geologists or geophysicists; Charles T. Hallmark who is a soil scientist; and archaeologists including Michael R. Waters, Thomas A. Jennings, Joshua L. Keene, Jessi Halligan, and Michael B. Collins.

The Folsom horizon in block A is defined within a 2.5 centimetres (0.98 in) thick layer containing 3 Folsom points. The Clovis horizon is found below Folsom within a 2.5 centimetres (0.98 in) thick layer containing Clovis diagnostics. The Buttermilk Creek complex is found below Clovis and defined within a 20 centimetres (7.9 in) thick layer containing artifacts. There were 18 OSL dates ranging from 14,000-17,500 BP taken from this layer. Lanceolate stemmed projectile points are found throughout this layer (OSL dated from around 15,500 to 13,500 years ago), beneath the Clovis horizon. Triangular lanceolate points are found by around 14,000 years ago.

Excavations show that there was nearly continual habitation of the site beginning with the Buttermilk Creek complex occupation and continuing through Clovis, Folsom, Golondrina, Dalton, Early Archaic, Late Archaic, and all the way through Late Prehistoric.

== Artifact assemblage ==
The Buttermilk Creek complex artifact assemblage is much larger and more varied than other North American sites advanced as having a pre-Clovis component. This is one of the main reasons why the claim of a pre-Clovis component at this site has been greeted with much more credibility than at most other potential pre-Clovis sites.

The Buttermilk Creek complex has yielded 15,528 pre-Clovis stone artifacts which have been separated into macrodebitage, microdebitage, and tools. The macrodebitage was counted, analyzed, and further subdivided into additional categories.

Tools were individually analyzed and included 5 blades, 14 bladelets, 12 bifaces, 1 discoidal core, 23 edge-modified tools, 3 radial break tools, and 1 piece of polished hematite.

There has been use-wear analysis done on some of the artifacts found in the Buttermilk Creek assemblage. The 4 artifacts that were analyzed for use-wear show polish and striations indicative of cutting, grooving, or incising of a hard material such as bone, wood, or antler.

There appears to be some connection between the Folsom, Clovis, and Buttermilk Creek assemblages at the site. The debitage found in all 3 horizons is characteristic of late stage lithic reduction, which shows that the site was used for the same purpose by each set of peoples.

However, by analyzing the tool to debitage ratio amongst the 3 assemblages it appears that the Buttermilk Creek peoples were using the site for a greater diversity of tasks than the Folsom and Clovis peoples.

One overshot flake and 3 partial overshot flakes found in the Buttermilk Creek complex suggest the possibility that they were starting to develop the knapping technologies that would be indicative of later Clovis technology.

The Clovis and Buttermilk Creek assemblages also show examples of blades and bladelets. The presence of certain core reduction techniques in the Buttermilk Creek assemblage suggests that Clovis lithic technologies and tool kit could have evolved from the Buttermilk Creek complex.

There are however, some differences in the lithic reduction techniques seen in each assemblage. Unlike the Folsom and Clovis assemblages there is no evidence of fluting or channel flakes in the Buttermilk Creek assemblage.

At the time of publication of the findings of the site in the journal Science in 2011, there had been no comprehensive study on refitting (or rejoining) of artifacts; however, preliminary examination has shown that there are refits present in both the Buttermilk Creek complex and other horizons. These include a total of 5 refits.

=== Oldest weapons found ===
The oldest weapons ever found in North America were discovered at the site in 2016 by a team led by Prof. Michael Waters. These are the ancient spear points, about 3-4 inches long, and they are dated to 15,500 years BP. They were made of chert, and were discovered along with some other tools under several feet of sediment. They are believed to have been used for hunting game in the area. These findings were published in 2018.

== Dating techniques ==
Due to poor preservation of organics the site was dated using optically stimulated luminescence (OSL). A total of 63 OSL dates have been obtained from the site, and along with diagnostic artifacts found in each stratigraphic layer they have helped to correctly identify the cultural horizons present at the site.

Samples for OSL dating were taken by hammering into the profile walls a copper pipe 10 centimetres (3.9 in) - 15 centimetres (5.9 in) long and 2.6 centimetres (1.0 in) in diameter. Each sample was examined using 3 different OSL dating techniques. The OSL dates helped to show that the site's stratigraphy and cultural horizons are undisturbed and in the correct chronological order; thus helping to support the claim that the Buttermilk Creek complex at the site is evidence of a Pre-Clovis occupation.

The integrity of the deposit, affected as it is by its vertisol soils, which undergo disturbance during opening and closing of cracks during moisture changes, has been questioned. Also, the very large errors and the researchers' assumptions about water content of the strata over thousands of years in regard to the OSL age estimates, have caused multiple critics to question the dating of the site and that of others of the complex nearby, such as Gault.

== See also ==
- Archaeology of the Americas
- Models of migration to the New World
- Norte Chico civilization
