= Michael R. Waters =

Michael Waters

Academic background
- Education: University of Arizona (BS, MS, PhD)

Academic work
- Discipline: Geoscience
- Sub-discipline: Geoarcheology
- Institutions: United States Geological Survey; Texas A&M University

Michael Waters is an American academic working as a professor of anthropology and geography at Texas A&M University, where he holds the Endowed Chair in First American Studies. He specializes in geoarchaeology, and has applied this method to the investigation of Clovis and later Paleo-Indian, and possible pre-Clovis occupation sites.

Waters is involved in four research projects, at the Debra L. Friedkin site in Texas, the Hogeye Clovis Cache site in Texas, the Coats–Hines mastodon site in Tennessee, and the Page–Ladson site in Florida. Since 2005, he has held the Endowed Chair in First American Studies at Texas A&M University, been director of the Center for the Study of the First Americans, and executive director of North Star Archaeological Research Program since 2002. His research is directed to the first inhabitants of the Americas and specifically, when and by what means did the first peoples come to the Americas and how they managed to adapt to the new environmental conditions.

== Education ==
Waters graduated from the University of Arizona in 1977 with a Bachelor of Science degree in geosciences. He began working part-time as a geologist for the United States Geological Survey in Denver, Colorado. He earned a Master of Science in geosciences from Arizona in 1980 and a PhD in geosciences in 1983.

== Career ==
From 1986 to 1991, Waters was an assistant professor in the Departments of Anthropology and Geography at Texas A&M. He worked as an associate professor from 1991 to 1998 and became a full professor in 1998.

Waters began excavations in the Buttermilk Creek Complex at the Debra L. Friedkin Paleo-Indian site in Texas in 2006. Over 15,528 artifacts have been found pointing to human occupation that pre-dates Clovis. The artifacts were dated using luminescence technology that placed the artifacts between 13,200 and 15,500 years ago. The artifacts include chipping debris and a mobile tool kit with 56 pieces such as blades, scrapers and choppers. The artifacts were found in floodplain deposits 25 cm below the Clovis horizon.

In 2000 and 2001, he worked at the Gault site in Texas, a site which has produced the greatest density of buried Clovis artifacts in North America. The Texas A&M team recovered more than 74,000 pieces of debitage and more than 1,300 artifacts, the majority of which originated from Clovis. These included fluted projectile points, bifaces, blade cores, blades, core tablets, end scrapers, and other tools. At this site geoarchaeological methods uncovered a complex stratigraphy of channel, bar, and floodplain sediments and buried paleosols, or soil preserved by burial under new sediments. The Clovis artifac

ts were localized at the base of the sequence with Folsom, Late Paleo-Indian and Archaic artifacts in superimposing deposits.

The Manis Mastodon site in Washington was originally excavated by Carl Gustavson in 1973; although no separate stone tools were found, one rib of the mastodon had an embedded bone projectile point. Gustavson dated the remains to around 14,000 years ago, but the evidence from this site has been disputed for many years. Waters and the North Star team reanalyzed the rib using modern technologies such as advanced AMS radiocarbon dating, high resolution X-ray CT imaging, and DNA and protein sequencing. They were able to determine that the object lodged in the mastodon's rib is a bone projectile point and the site is indeed around 14,000 years old. This site provides evidence that mastodon hunting by pre-Clovis peoples was occurring at the end of the Ice Age.

In 2007, Waters published a paper with Thomas Stafford re-dating many of the key Clovis sites in North America to between 13,000 and 12,700 years ago.

== Awards and honors ==
In 1977, Waters was awarded the Evans B. Mayo award from the University of Arizona for outstanding performance in field geology. In 2004, he was awarded a Rip Rapp Archaeological Geology Award y from the Geological Society of America, which made him a Fellow that same year. In 2003 the Geological Society of America also presented him a Kirk Bryan Award, which celebrates a published paper that advances the field of geomorphology or a related field such as Quaternary geology.

== Selected books and monographs ==
- Waters, M. R., Pevny, C. D., and Carlson, D. L., 2011, Clovis Lithic Technology: Investigation of a Stratified Workshop at the Gault Site, Texas: College Station, Texas A&M University Press, 226 p.
- Waters, M. R., 2012 2011, Principles of Geoarchaeology: A North American Perspective, Japanese Language Edition: Tokyo, Japan
- Waters, M. R., 2004, Lone Star Stalag: German Prisoners of War at Camp Hearne: College Station, Texas A&M University Press, 268 p.
- Waters, M. R., 1992, Principles of Geoarchaeology: A North American Perspective: Tucson, University of Arizona Press, 398 p.
- Wallace, C. A., Lidke, D. J., Waters, M. R., and Obradovich, J. D., 1989, Rocks and structure of the southern Sapphire Mountains, Granite and Ravalli Counties, western Montana: U.S. Geological Survey Bulletin 1824, 29 p., 1 color geologic map.
- Waters, M. R., 1986, The Geoarchaeology of Whitewater Draw, Arizona: University of Arizona Anthropological Papers no. 45: Tucson, University of Arizona Press, 81 p.
