= Peopling of the Americas =

Prehistoric migration from Asia to the Americas

Map of early human migrations based on the Out of Africa theory; figures are in thousands of years ago (kya).

The peopling of the Americas is believed to have begun when Paleolithic hunter-gatherers (Paleo-Indians) entered North America from the North Asian Mammoth steppe via the Beringia land bridge, which had formed between northeastern Siberia and western Alaska due to the lowering of sea level during the Last Glacial Maximum (26,000 to 19,000 years ago). These populations expanded south of the Laurentide ice sheet, either by sea or land, and spread rapidly southward, occupying both North and South America no later than 14,000 years ago, and possibly before 20,000 years ago. The earliest populations in the Americas, before roughly 10,000 years ago, are known as Paleo-Indians. Indigenous peoples of the Americas have been linked to Siberian populations by the distribution of blood types, and in genetic composition as reflected by molecular data, such as DNA.

While there is general agreement that the Americas were first settled from Asia, the migration patterns and the place(s) of origin in Eurasia of the peoples who migrated to the Americas remain unclear. The most generally accepted theory is that Ancient Beringians moved when sea levels were significantly lowered due to the Quaternary glaciation, following herds of now-extinct Pleistocene megafauna along ice-free corridors that stretched between the Laurentide and Cordilleran ice sheets. Another proposed route has them migrating down the Pacific coast to South America as far as Chile, either on foot or using boats. Any archaeological evidence of coastal occupation during the last Ice Age would now have been covered by the sea level rise, up to a hundred meters since then.

The precise date for the peopling of the Americas is a long-standing open question. While advances in archaeology, Pleistocene geology, physical anthropology, and DNA analysis have progressively shed more light on the subject, significant questions remain unresolved. The Clovis First theory refers to the hypothesis that the Clovis culture represents the earliest human presence in the Americas about 13,000 years ago. Evidence of pre-Clovis cultures has accumulated and pushed back the possible date of the first peopling of the Americas. Academics generally believe that humans reached North America south of the Laurentide Ice Sheet at some point between 15,000 and 20,000 years ago. Current debates center around four glacial-age openings which could have allowed entry into North America: coastal around 24,000 and 15,000 years ago, inland around 14,000 years ago, and coastal around 12,000 years ago. The Swan Point Archaeological Site located in Alaska has yielded the oldest evidence of human habitation that is not disputed, with artifacts that have radiocarbon dates of 14,000 years, indicating the site was occupied around 12,000 BCE.

== Scholarly debate ==
Map of the oldest archaeological sites in the Americas under debate .

Historically, researchers thought a single theory explained the peopling of the Americas, focusing on findings from Blackwater Draw, New Mexico, where human artifacts dated from the last ice age were found alongside the remains of extinct animals in the 1930s. This led to the widespread assent to the Clovis First theory, proposing that the first Americans migrated over the Beringia land bridge from Asia during a time when glacial passages opened. This model linked the first inhabitants to distinctive spear points, known as Clovis points, dating to 13,250 to 12,800 years ago.

Numerous claims of earlier human presence began to challenge the Clovis first model beginning in the 1990s, culminating in significant discoveries at Monte Verde, Chile, dating back 14,500 years. At Oregon's Paisley Caves, fossilized human feces date back 14,300 years. In Texas, at Buttermilk Creek complex, stone tool fragments date back 15,500 years. At Arroyo Seco 2 in Argentina, archaeologists discovered 14,000-year-old butchered animal bones. Meadowcroft Rockshelter in Pennsylvania may have a history of at least 16,000 years. However, firm dates for key sites like Monte Verde, Chile are still an ongoing debate. The Swan Point Archaeological Site in eastern central Alaska has yielded the oldest evidence of human habitation that is not disputed. Artifacts, faunal remains, and hearths at the site have radiocarbon dates of 14,000 years, indicating the site was occupied around 12,000 BCE.

As research progressed in the 2000s, the narrative shifted from a single migration event to multiple small, diverse groups entering the continent at various points in time. This indicates that people might have populated North and South America as early as 15,000 to 20,000 years ago, which some think supports a coastal migration route.

The genetic history of the Indigenous peoples of the Americas has highlighted populations that adapted over tens of thousands of years. Geneticists discovered that a Beringian population split from Siberian groups about 36,000 years ago. Around 25,000 years ago, they became isolated, forming a new genetic group linked to today's Indigenous populations, which divided into two main lineages between 14,500 and 17,000 years ago reflecting the dispersal associated with the early peopling of the Americas.

The Chiquihuite Cave in Mexico is a possible Upper Paleolithic archaeological site in the Astillero Mountains, Zacatecas State, in North-Central Mexico. Chiquihuite Cave may provide evidence of early human presence in the Western Hemisphere dating back as far as 33,000 years ago. Stones discovered here, thought to be lithic artifacts, have been dated to 26,000 years ago based on more than 50 samples of animal bone and charcoal found in association with these stones. However, there is scholarly debate over whether the stones are truly artifacts (human-made tools that are evidence of human presence) or if they were formed naturally. No evidence of human DNA or hearths has been unearthed.

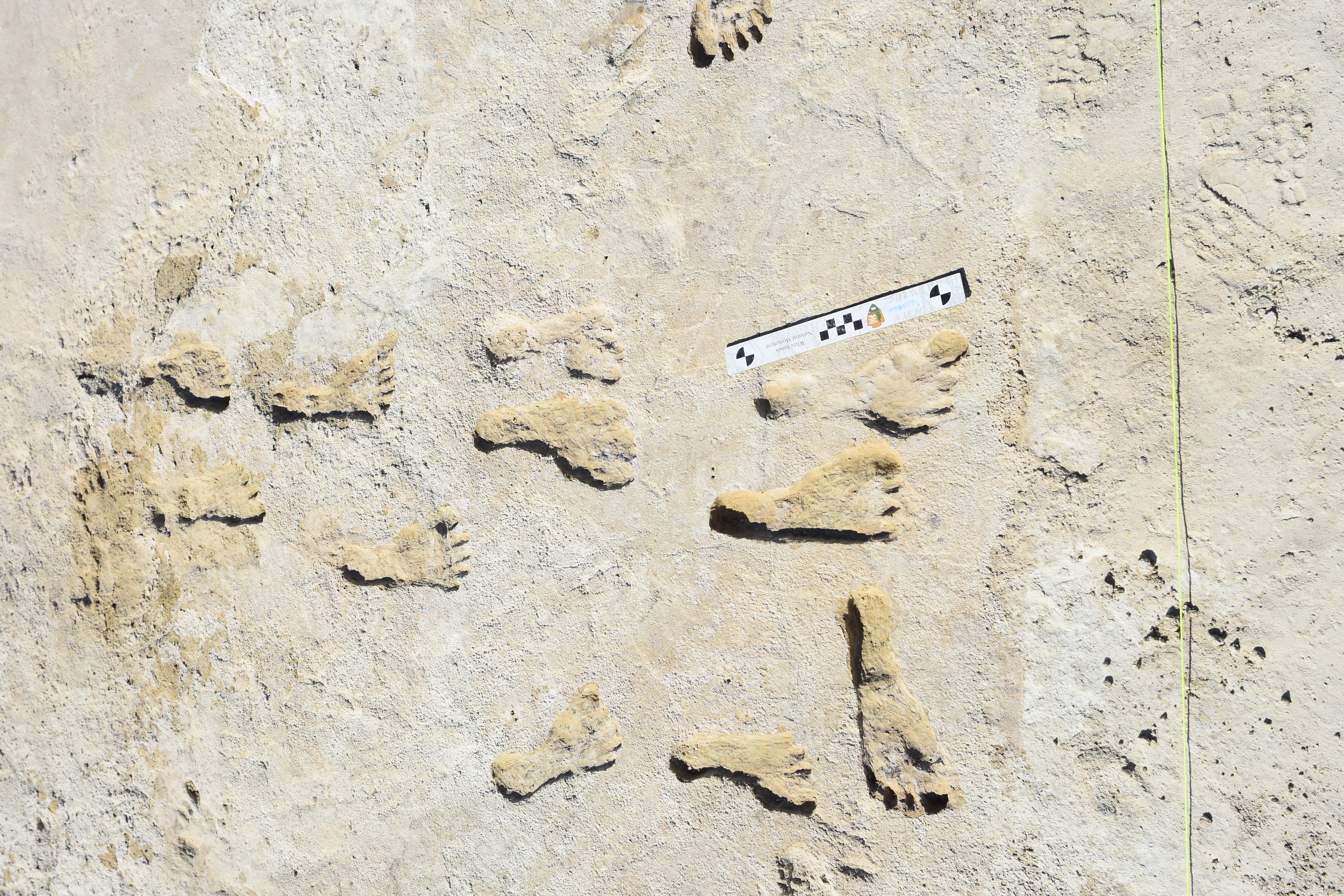
Fossilized human footprints at White Sands National Park in the US have been dated to 21,000–23,000 years ago.

The potentially oldest known human footprints in North America were found at White Sands National Park in New Mexico, United States by researchers who identified approximately 60 fossilized footprints buried in layers of gypsum soil on a large playa in the Tularosa Basin. Multiple human footprints are stratigraphically constrained and bracketed by layers containing seeds of Ruppia cirrhosa that yield calibrated radiocarbon ages between 21,000 and 23,000 years ago, according to the U.S. Geological Survey. These estimates were questioned by other authors, who suggested that the dating could potentially be erroneous, due to the fact that Ruppia cirrhosa intakes carbon from the water in which it grows rather than the air, which may introduce systematic error making the seeds seem older than they actually are. A series of follow up studies supported by a variety of methods, including radiocarbon dating of pollen and optically stimulated luminescence dating of quartz grains within the footprint layers confirmed the original findings Nonetheless, the dates are still a matter of ongoing debate in academia, centered around "physical mixing and the hard water effect on radiocarbon dates".

Some argue that evidence points towards human presence extending back 130,000 years near San Diego, California at the Cerutti Mastodon site, though the vast majority of scholars across multiple academic fields outright rejects this. Scholars such as David J. Meltzer have emphasized the fact that there are no verified archaeological sites in the Americas older than 16,000 years accepted by the academic community at large, which questions claims of sites being 20,000, 25,000, or even 130,000 years old.

== Environment during the latest glaciation ==
=== Emergence and submergence of Beringia ===
Figure 1. Submergence of the Beringian land bridge with post-Last Glacial Maximum (LGM) rise in eustatic sea level.

During the Wisconsin glaciation, the Earth's ocean water was, to varying degrees over time, stored in glacier ice. As water accumulated in glaciers, the volume of water in the oceans correspondingly decreased, resulting in a lowering of global sea level. The variation in sea level over time has been reconstructed using oxygen isotope analysis of deep-sea cores, dating of marine terraces, and high-resolution oxygen-isotope sampling from ocean basins and modern ice caps. A drop of eustatic sea level by about 60 to 120 metres (200 to 390 ft) from present-day levels, commencing around 30,000 years before present (BP), created Beringia, a durable and extensive geographic feature connecting Siberia with Alaska. With the rise of sea level after the Last Glacial Maximum (LGM), the Beringian land bridge was again submerged. Estimates of the final re-submergence of the Beringian land bridge, based solely on present bathymetry of the Bering Strait and the eustatic sea-level curve, place the event around 11,000 years BP (Figure 1). Ongoing research reconstructing Beringian paleogeography during deglaciation could change that estimate, and possible earlier submergence could further constrain models of human migration into North America.

=== Glaciers ===
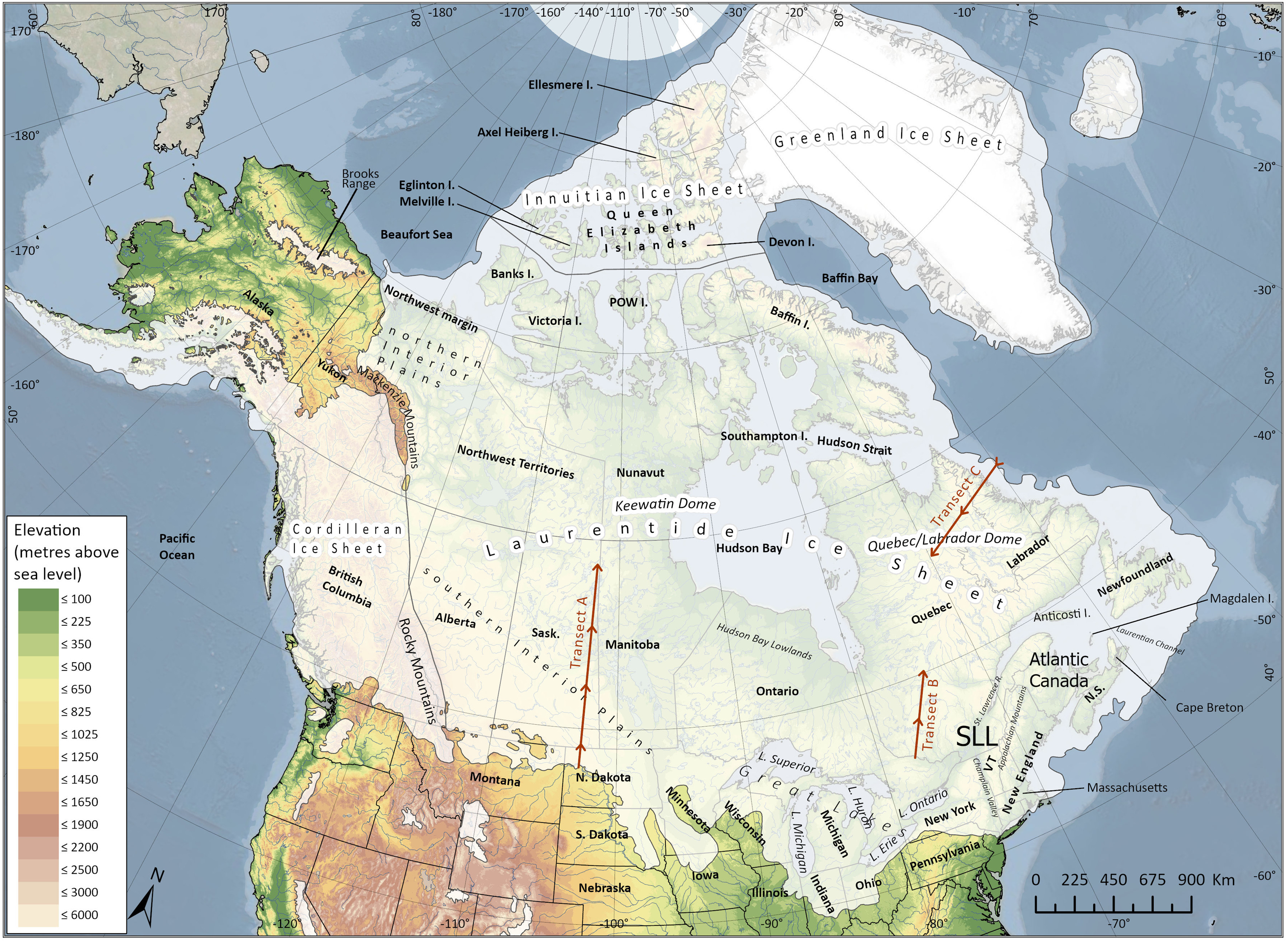
A map of the glaciated regions of North America during the Last Glacial Maximum

The onset of the Last Glacial Maximum after 30,000 years BP saw the expansion of alpine glaciers and continental ice sheets that blocked migration routes out of Beringia. By 21,000 years BP, and possibly thousands of years earlier, the Cordilleran and Laurentide ice sheets coalesced east of the Rocky Mountains, closing off a potential migration route into the center of North America. Alpine glaciers in the coastal ranges and the Alaskan Peninsula isolated the interior of Beringia from the Pacific coast. Coastal alpine glaciers and lobes of Cordilleran ice coalesced into piedmont glaciers that covered large stretches of the coastline as far south as Vancouver Island and formed an ice lobe across the Straits of Juan de Fuca by 18,000 BP. Coastal alpine glaciers started to retreat around 19,000 BP while Cordilleran ice continued advancing in the Puget lowlands up to 16,800 BP. Even during the maximum extent of coastal ice, unglaciated refugia persisted on present-day islands, that supported terrestrial and marine mammals. As deglaciation occurred, refugia expanded until the coast became ice-free by 15,000 BP. The retreat of glaciers on the Alaskan Peninsula provided access from Beringia to the Pacific coast by around 17,000 BP. The ice barrier between interior Alaska and the Pacific coast broke up starting around 16,200 BP. The ice-free corridor to the interior of North America opened between 13,000 and 12,000 BP. Glaciation in eastern Siberia during the LGM was limited to alpine and valley glaciers in mountain ranges and did not block access between Siberia and Beringia.

=== Climate and biological environments ===
Vegetation cover at the Last Glacial Maximum period ~18,000 years ago, describing the type of vegetation cover present

The paleoclimates and vegetation of eastern Siberia and Alaska during the Wisconsin glaciation have been deduced from high resolution oxygen isotope data and pollen stratigraphy. Prior to the Last Glacial Maximum, climates in eastern Siberia fluctuated between conditions approximating present day conditions and colder periods. The pre-LGM warm cycles in Arctic Siberia saw flourishes of megafauna. The oxygen isotope record from the Greenland Ice Cap suggests that these cycles after about 45,000 BP lasted anywhere from hundreds to between one and two thousand years, with greater duration of cold periods starting around 32,000 BP. The pollen record from Elikchan Lake, north of the Sea of Okhotsk, shows a marked shift from tree and shrub pollen to herb pollen prior to 30,000 BP, as herb tundra replaced boreal forest and shrub steppe going into the LGM. A similar record of tree/shrub pollen being replaced with herb pollen as the LGM approached was recovered near the Kolyma River in Arctic Siberia. The abandonment of the northern regions of Siberia due to rapid cooling or the retreat of game species with the onset of the LGM has been proposed to explain the lack of archaeological sites in that region dating to the LGM. The pollen record from the Alaskan side shows shifts between herb/shrub and shrub tundra prior to the LGM, suggesting less dramatic warming episodes than those that allowed forest colonization on the Siberian side. Diverse, though not necessarily plentiful, megafauna were present in those environments. Herb tundra dominated during the LGM, due to cold and dry conditions.

Coastal environments during the Last Glacial Maximum were complex. The lowered sea level and an isostatic bulge equilibrated with the depression beneath the Cordilleran Ice Sheet, exposing the continental shelf to form a coastal plain. While much of the coastal plain was covered with piedmont glaciers, unglaciated refugia supporting terrestrial mammals have been identified on Haida Gwaii, Prince of Wales Island, and outer islands of the Alexander Archipelago. The now-submerged coastal plain has potential for more refugia. Pollen data indicate mostly herb/shrub tundra vegetation in unglaciated areas, with some boreal forest towards the southern end of the range of Cordilleran ice. The coastal marine environment remained productive, as indicated by fossils of pinnipeds. The highly productive kelp forests over rocky marine shallows may have been a lure for coastal migration. Reconstruction of the southern Beringian coastline also suggests potential for a highly productive coastal marine environment.

=== Environmental changes during deglaciation ===
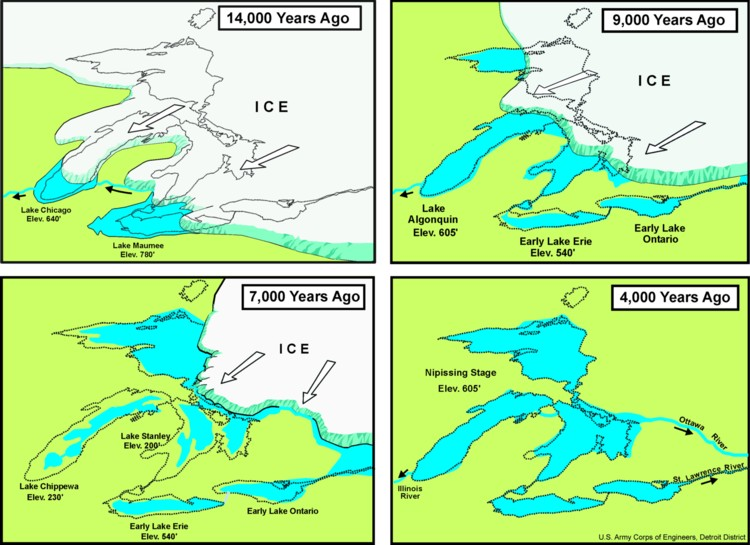
A diagram of the formation of the Great Lakes

Pollen data indicate a warm period culminating between 17,000 and 13,000 BP, followed by cooling between 13,000 and 11,500 BP. Coastal areas deglaciated rapidly as coastal alpine glaciers, then lobes of Cordilleran ice, retreated. The retreat accelerated as sea levels rose and glacial termini floated. It has been estimated that the coast range was fully ice-free between 16,000 and 15,000 BP. Littoral marine organisms colonized shorelines as ocean water replaced glacial meltwater. Replacement of herb/shrub tundra by coniferous forests was underway by 15,000 BP north of Haida Gwaii. Eustatic sea-level rise caused flooding, which accelerated as the rate increased.

The inland Cordilleran and Laurentide ice sheets retreated more slowly than did the coastal glaciers. Opening of an ice-free corridor did not occur until after 13,000 to 12,000 BP. The early environment of the ice-free corridor was dominated by glacial outwash and meltwater, with ice-dammed lakes and periodic flooding from the release of ice-dammed meltwater. Biological productivity of the deglaciated landscape increased slowly. The earliest possible viability of the ice-free corridor as a human migration route has been estimated at 11,500 BP.

Birch forests were advancing across former herb tundra in Beringia by 17,000 BP in response to climatic amelioration, indicating increased landscape productivity.

Analyses of biomarkers and microfossils preserved in sediments from Lake E5 and Burial Lake in northern Alaska suggest early humans burned Beringian landscapes as early as 34,000 years ago. The authors of these studies suggest that fire was used as means of hunting megafauna.

== Chronology, reasons for, and sources of migration ==
The Indigenous peoples of the Americas have an established archaeological presence dating back to about 15,000 years ago. More recent research, however, suggests a human presence dating to between 18,000 and 26,000 years ago, during the Last Glacial Maximum. There remain uncertainties regarding the precise dating of individual sites and regarding conclusions drawn from population genetics studies of contemporary Native Americans.

=== Chronology ===
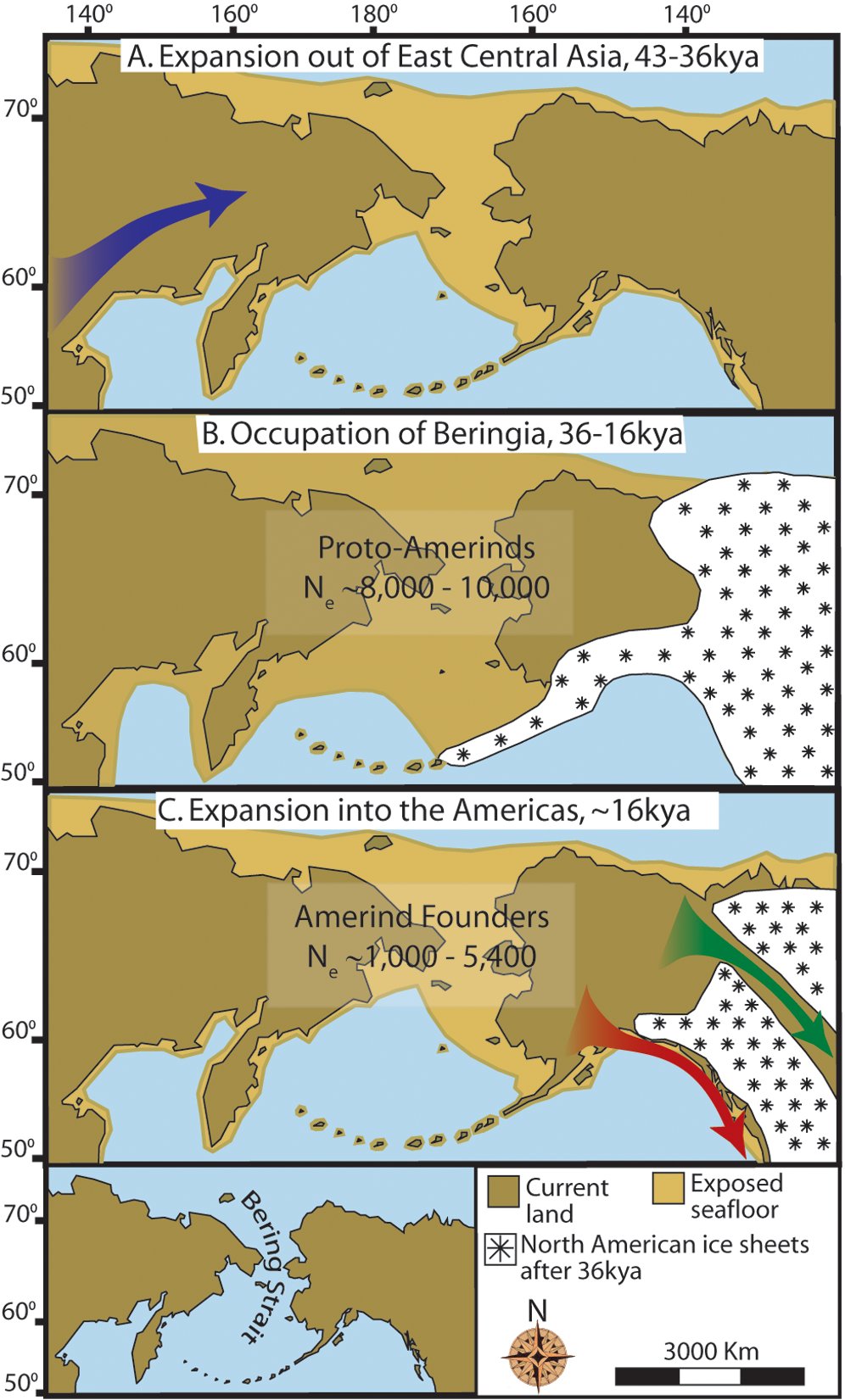
Map of Beringia showing the exposed seafloor and glaciation at 40,000 years ago and 16,000 years ago. The green arrow indicates the "interior migration" model along an ice-free corridor separating the major continental ice sheets, the red arrow indicates the "coastal migration" model, both leading to a "rapid colonization" of the Americas after c. 16,000 years ago.

In the early 21st century, models of migration chronology are divided into two general approaches.

The first is the short chronology theory, which holds that the first migration occurred after the LGM, declined after about 19,000 years ago, and was then followed by successive waves of immigrants.

The second theory is the long chronology theory, which proposes that the first group of people entered Beringia, including ice-free parts of Alaska, at a much earlier date, possibly 40,000 years ago, followed by a much later second wave of immigrants.

The Clovis First theory, which dominated thinking on New World anthropology for much of the 20th century, was challenged in the 2000s by the secure dating of archaeological sites in the Americas to before 13,000 years ago.

The archaeological sites in the Americas with the oldest dates that have gained broad acceptance are all compatible with an age of about 15,000 years. This includes the Buttermilk Creek Complex in Texas, the Meadowcroft Rockshelter site in Pennsylvania and the Monte Verde site in southern Chile. Archaeological evidence of pre-Clovis people points to the South Carolina Topper Site being 16,000 years old, at a time when the glacial maximum would have theoretically allowed for lower coastlines.

It has often been suggested that an ice-free corridor, in what is now Western Canada, would have allowed migration before the beginning of the Holocene. However, a 2016 study has argued against this, suggesting that the peopling of North America via such a corridor is unlikely to predate the earliest Clovis sites significantly. The study concludes that the ice-free corridor in what is now Alberta and British Columbia "was gradually taken over by a boreal forest dominated by spruce and pine trees" and that the "Clovis people likely came from the south, not the north, perhaps following wild animals such as bison". An alternative hypothesis for the peopling of America is coastal migration, which may have been feasible along the deglaciated (but now submerged) coastline of the Pacific Northwest from about 16,000 years ago.

==== Evidence for pre-LGM human presence ====
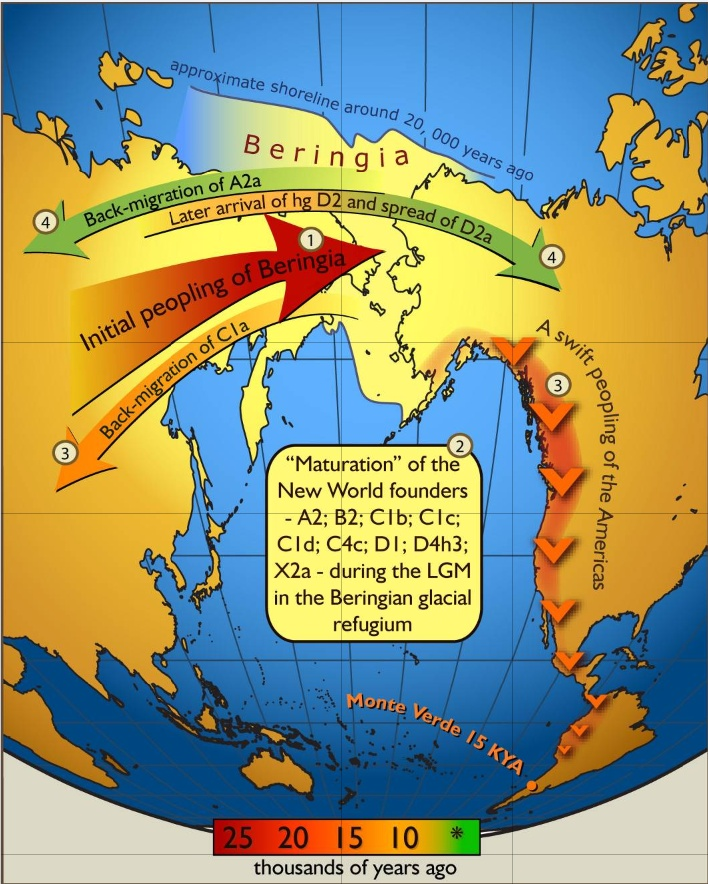
Figure 2. Schematic illustration of maternal (mtDNA) gene-flow in and out of Beringia (long chronology, single source model).

Pre-LGM migration across Beringia has been proposed to explain purported pre-LGM ages of archaeological sites in the Americas such as Bluefish Caves and Old Crow Flats in the Yukon Territory, and Meadowcroft Rock Shelter in Pennsylvania. The oldest archaeological sites on the Alaskan side of Beringia date to around 14,000 BP. A small founder population may have entered Beringia before that time. However, archaeological sites dating closer to the LGM on either the Siberian or Alaskan side of Beringia are lacking. Biomarker and microfossil analyses of sediments from Lake E5 and Burial Lake in northern Alaska suggest human presence in eastern Beringia as early as 34,000 years ago. These sedimentary analyses have been suggested to be the only possibly recoverable remnants of humans living in Alaska during the last Glacial period.

At Old Crow Flats, mammoth bones have been found broken in distinctive ways, indicating human butchery—the radiocarbon dates for these bones range from 25,000 to 40,000 BP. Also, stone microflakes have been found in the area, indicating tool production. However, the interpretations of butcher marks and the geologic association of bones at the Bluefish Cave and Old Crow Flats sites, and the related Bonnet Plume site, have been called into question. No evidence of human remains has been discovered at these sites. In addition to disputed archaeological sites, evidence for pre-LGM human presence has been found in lake-sediment records from northern Alaska. Biomarker and microfossil analyses of sediments from Lake E5 and Burial Lake suggest human presence in eastern Beringia as early as 34,000 years ago. These analyses are indeed compelling in that they corroborate the inferences made from the Bluefish Cave and Old Crow Flats sites.

In 2020, evidence emerged for a new pre-LGM site in North-Central Mexico. Chiquihuite cave, an archaeological site in Zacatecas State, has been dated to 26,000 years BP based on numerous lithic artifacts discovered there. However, there is scholarly debate over whether the artifacts should be considered evidence of human activity or if they were formed naturally. No evidence of human DNA or hearth has been unearthed.

Pre-LGM human presence in South America rests partly on the chronology of the controversial Pedra Furada rock shelter in Piauí, Brazil. More recently, studies at the archaeological sites Santa Elina (27000–10000 years BP) in the midwest, and Rincão I (20000–12000 years BP) in southeastern Brazil also show associations of evidence of human presence with sediments dating from before the LGM. A 2003 study dated evidence for the controlled use of fire to before 40,000 years ago. Additional evidence has been adduced from the morphology of Luzia Woman fossil, which was described as Australo-Melanesian. This interpretation was challenged in a 2003 review, which concluded the features in question could also have arisen by genetic drift. In November 2018, scientists of the University of São Paulo and Harvard University released a study that contradicts the alleged Australo-Melanesian origin of Luzia. Using DNA sequencing, the results showed that Luzia's ancestry was entirely Native American.

Stones described as probable tools, hammerstones and anvils, have been found in southern California, at the Cerutti Mastodon site, that are associated with a mastodon skeleton which appeared to have been processed by humans. The mastodon skeleton was dated by thorium-230/uranium radiometric analysis, using diffusion–adsorption–decay dating models, to around 130 thousand years ago. No human bones were found and expert reaction was mixed; claims of tools and bone processing were called "not plausible" by Prof. Tom Dillehay.

The Yana River Rhino Horn site (RHS) has dated human occupation of eastern Arctic Siberia to 31,300 BP. Some have interpreted that date as evidence that migration into Beringia was imminent, lending credence to occupation of Beringia during the LGM. However, the Yana RHS date is from the beginning of the cooling period that led into the LGM. A compilation of archaeological site dates throughout eastern Siberia suggest that the cooling period caused a retreat of humans southwards. Pre-LGM lithic evidence in Siberia indicates a settled lifestyle that was based on local resources, while post-LGM lithic evidence indicates a more migratory lifestyle.

A 2021 discovery of human footprints in relict lake sediments near White Sands National Park in New Mexico demonstrated there was a verifiable human presence in the region dating back to the LGM between 18,000 and 26,000 years ago. Later studies, reported in October 2023, confirmed that the age of the human footprints to be "up to 23,000 years old". A 2025 study based on radiocarbon dating performed by two independent labs provided an estimate for the White Sands footprints site of >23,600-17,000 calibrated years Before Present.

Many academics have not accepted the veracity of these findings. In 2022, they said, "The oldest evidence for archaeological sites in the New World with large numbers of artifacts occurring in discrete and minimally disturbed stratigraphic contexts occurs in eastern Beringia between 13,000 and 14,200 BP. South of the ice sheets, the oldest such sites occur in association with pre Clovis complex. If humans managed to breach the continental ice sheets significantly before 13,000 BP, there should be clear evidence for it in the form of at least some stratigraphically discrete archaeological components with a relatively high artifact count. So far, no such evidence exists".

==== Genomic age estimates ====
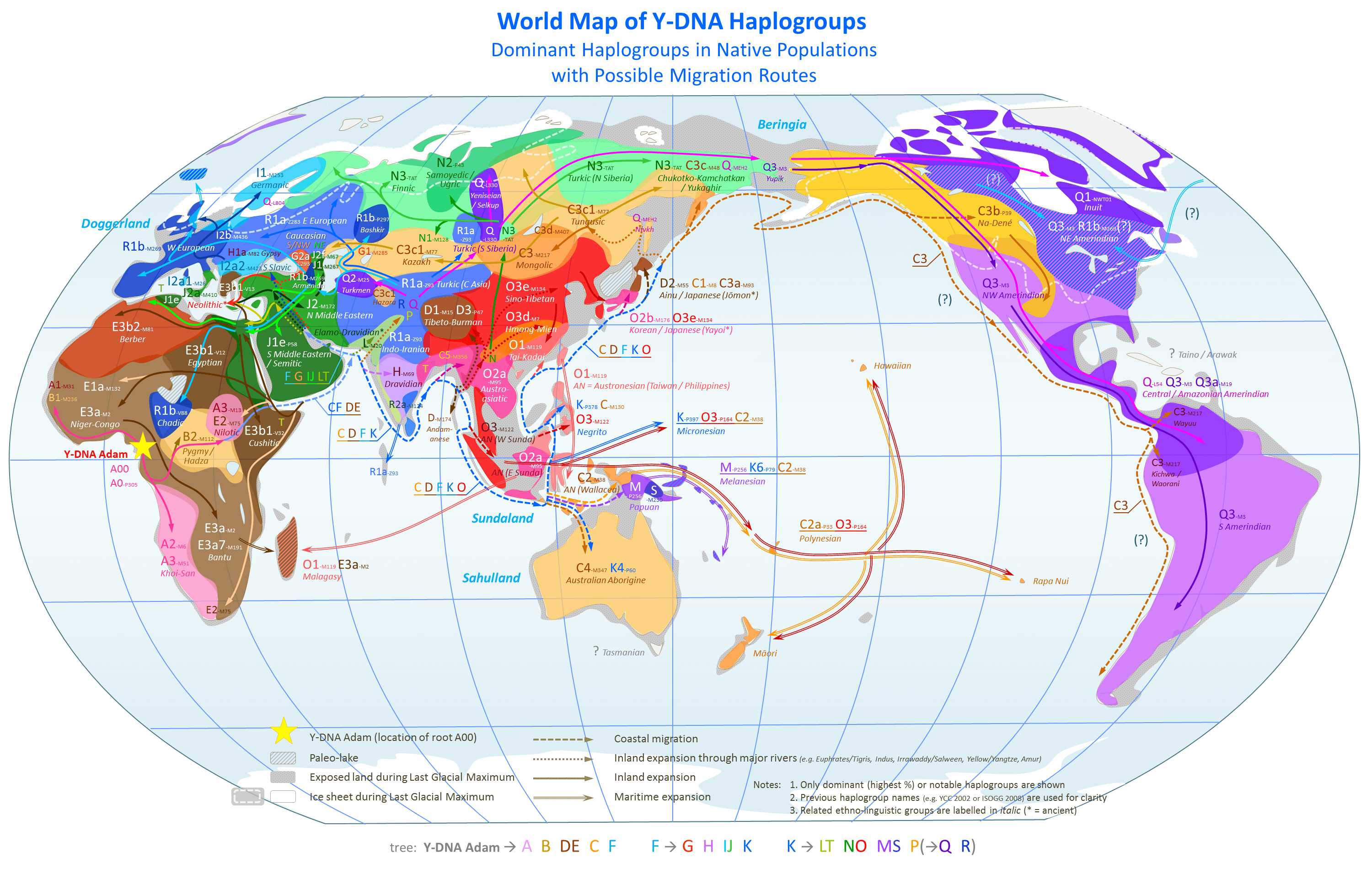
Map of Y-Chromosome Haplogroups – dominant haplogroups in pre-colonial populations with proposed migrations routes

Genetic studies have used high resolution analytical techniques applied to DNA samples from modern Native Americans and Asian populations regarded as their source populations to reconstruct the development of human Y-chromosome DNA haplogroups (yDNA haplogroups) and human mitochondrial DNA haplogroups (mtDNA haplogroups) characteristic of Native American populations. Models of molecular evolution rates were used to estimate the ages at which Native American DNA lineages branched off from their parent lineages in Asia and to deduce the ages of demographic events. One model (Tammetal 2007) based on Native American mtDNA Haplotypes (Figure 2) proposes that migration into Beringia occurred between 30,000 and 25,000 BP, with migration into the Americas occurring around 10,000 to 15,000 years after isolation of the small founding population. Another model (Kitchen et al. 2008) proposes that migration into Beringia occurred approximately 36,000 BP, followed by 20,000 years of isolation in Beringia. A third model (Nomatto et al. 2009) proposes that migration into Beringia occurred between 40,000 and 30,000 BP, with a pre-LGM migration into the Americas followed by isolation of the northern population following closure of the ice-free corridor. Evidence of Australo-Melanesian admixture in Amazonian populations was published in 2016.

A study of the diversification of mtDNA Haplogroups C and D from southern Siberia and eastern Asia, respectively, suggests that the parent lineage (Subhaplogroup D4h) of Subhaplogroup D4h3, a lineage found among Native Americans and Han Chinese, emerged around 20,000 BP, constraining the emergence of D4h3 to post-LGM. Age estimates based on Y-chromosome micro-satellite diversity place origin of the American Haplogroup Q1a3a (Y-DNA) at around 15,000 to 10,000 BP. Greater consistency of DNA molecular evolution rate models with each other and with archaeological data may be gained by the use of dated fossil DNA to calibrate molecular evolution rates.

The Ancient Beringian (AB) is a human archaeogenetic lineage, based on the genome of an infant found at the Upward Sun River site (dubbed USR1), dated to 11,500 years ago. The AB lineage diverged from the Ancestral Native American (ANA) lineage about 20,000 years ago. The ANA lineage was estimated as having been formed between 20,000 and 25,000 years ago by a mixture of East Asian (~65%) and Ancient North Eurasian (~35%) lineages, consistent with the model of the peopling of the Americas via Beringia during the Last Glacial Maximum.

==== Megafaunal migrations ====
Although there is no direct archaeological evidence for a coastal migration route during the Last Glacial Maximum, genetic analysis has been used to support this thesis. In addition to human genetic lineage, megafaunal DNA lineage can be used to trace movements of megafauna – large mammalian – as well as the early human groups who hunted them.

Bison, a type of megafauna, has been identified as an ideal candidate for tracing human migrations out of Europe because of its abundance in North America and its status as one of the first megafauna species for which ancient DNA has been used to trace patterns of population movement. Unlike other types of fauna that moved between the Americas and Eurasia (mammoths, horses, and lions), Bison survived the North American extinction event that occurred at the end of the Pleistocene. Their genome, however, contains evidence of a bottleneck – something that can be used to test hypotheses on migrations between the two continents. Early human groups were largely nomadic, relying on following food sources for survival. Mobility was part of what made humans successful. As nomadic groups, early humans likely followed food sources from Eurasia to the Americas – part of why tracing megafaunal DNA is so helpful for gaining insight into these migratory patterns.

The grey wolf originated in the Americas and migrated into Eurasia before the Last Glacial Maximum, during which it is believed that remaining populations in North America faced extinction and were isolated from the rest of the population. This, however, may not be the case. Radiocarbon dating of ancient grey wolf remains found in permafrost deposits in Alaska shows a continuous exchange of populations from 12,500 radiocarbon years BP to beyond the limits of radiocarbon dating. This indicates that there was viable passage for grey wolf populations to exchange between the two continents.

These faunas' ability to exchange populations during the Last Glacial Maximum, along with genetic evidence from early human remains in the Americas, supports pre-Clovis migrations into the Americas.

=== Source populations ===
The Native American source population was formed in Siberia by the mixing of two distinct populations: Ancient North Eurasians and an ancient East Asian (ESEA) population. According to Jennifer Raff, the Ancient North Eurasian population mixed with a daughter population of ancient East Asians, whom they encountered around 25,000 years ago, which led to the emergence of Native American ancestral populations. However, the exact location of the admixture is unknown, and the migratory movements that united the two populations remain a matter of debate.

One theory posits that Ancient North Eurasians migrated south to East Asia or Southern Siberia, where they would have encountered and intermixed with ancient East Asians. Genetic evidence from Lake Baikal in Russia supports this area as the site of the admixture.

However, a third theory, the "Beringian standstill hypothesis", suggests that East Asians instead migrated north to Northeastern Siberia, where they mixed with ANE, and later diverged in Beringia, where distinct Native American lineages formed. This theory is supported by maternal and nuclear DNA evidence. According to Grebenyuk, after 20,000 BP, a branch of Ancient East Asians migrated to Northeastern Siberia, and mixed with descendants of the ANE, leading to the emergence of Ancient Paleo-Siberian and Native American populations in Extreme Northeastern Asia.

However, the Beringian standstill hypothesis is not supported by paternal DNA evidence, which may reflect different population histories for paternal and maternal lineages in Native Americans, which is not uncommon and has been observed in other populations.

A 2019 study suggested that Native Americans are the closest living relatives to 10,000-year-old fossils found near the Kolyma River in northeastern Siberia.

A study published in July 2022 suggested that people in southern China may have contributed to the Native American gene pool, based on the discovery and DNA analysis of 14,000-year-old human fossils.

The contrast between the genetic profiles of the Hokkaido Jōmon skeletons and those of the modern Ainu illustrates another uncertainty in source models based on modern DNA samples.

==== Mitochondrial (mtDNA) lineages ====
The development of high-resolution genomic analysis has provided opportunities to define Native American subclades further and to narrow the range of Asian subclades that may be parent or sister subclades.

The common occurrence of the mtDNA Haplogroups A, B, C, and D among eastern Asian and Native American populations has long been recognized, along with the presence of haplogroup X. As a whole, the greatest frequency of the four Native American associated haplogroups occurs in the Altai-Baikal region of southern Siberia. Some subclades of C and D closer to the Native American subclades occur among Mongolian, Amur, Japanese, Korean, and Ainu populations.

As subclades related to Native American populations are further defined, the requirements for sampling Asian populations to identify the most closely related subclades become more specific. Subhaplogroups D1 and D4h3 have been regarded as Native American-specific because they are absent from a large sample of populations considered potential descendants of source populations across a wide area of Asia. Among the 3,764 samples, the Sakhalin–lower Amur region was represented by 61 Oroks. In another study, Subhaplogroup D1a has been identified among the Ulchis of the lower Amur River region (4 among 87 sampled, or 4.6%), along with Subhaplogroup C1a (1 among 87, or 1.1%). Subhaplogroup C1a is regarded as a close sister clade of the Native American Subhaplogroup C1b.

Subhaplogroup D1a has also been found among ancient Jōmon skeletons from Hokkaido The modern Ainu are regarded as descendants of the Jōmon. The occurrence of the Subhaplogroups D1a and C1a in the lower Amur region suggests a source population from that region distinct from the Altai-Baikal source populations, where sampling did not reveal those two particular subclades. The conclusions regarding Subhaplogroup D1 indicating potential source populations in the lower Amur and Hokkaido areas stand in contrast to the single-source migration model.

Subhaplogroup D4h3 has been identified among Han Chinese. Subhaplogroup D4h3 from China does not have the same geographic implication as Subhaplotype D1a from Amur-Hokkaido, so its implications for source models are more speculative. Its parent lineage, Subhaplotype D4h, is believed to have emerged in East Asia, rather than Siberia, around 20,000 BP. Subhaplogroup D4h2, a sister clade of D4h3, has also been found among Jōmon skeletons from Hokkaido. D4h3 has a coastal trace in the Americas.

X is one of the five mtDNA haplogroups found in Indigenous Americans. Native Americans mostly belong to the X2a clade, which has never been found in the Old World. According to Jennifer Raff, X2a probably originated in the same Siberian population as the other four founding maternal lineages, and that there is no compelling reason to believe it is related to X lineages found in Europe or West Eurasia. The Kennewick man fossil was found to carry the deepest branch of the X2a haplogroup, and he had no European ancestry, as expected if the lineage originated in Europe.

==== HTLV-1 genomics ====
The Human T cell Lymphotrophic Virus 1 (HTLV-1) is a virus transmitted through exchange of bodily fluids and from mother to child through breast milk. The mother-to-child transmission mimics a hereditary trait, although such transmission from maternal carriers is less than 100%. The HTLV virus genome has been mapped, allowing identification of four major strains and analysis of their antiquity through mutations. The highest geographic concentrations of the strain HLTV-1 are in sub-Saharan Africa and Japan. In Japan, it occurs in its highest concentration on Kyushu. It is also present among African descendants and native populations in the Caribbean region and South America. It is rare in Central America and North America. Its distribution in the Americas has been regarded as due to importation with the slave trade.

The Ainu have developed antibodies to HTLV-1, indicating its endemicity to the Ainu and its antiquity in Japan. A subtype "A" has been defined and identified among the Japanese (including Ainu), and among Caribbean and South American isolates. A subtype "B" has been identified in Japan and India. In 1995, Native Americans in coastal British Columbia were found to have both subtypes A and B. Bone marrow specimens from an Andean mummy about 1500 years old were reported to have shown the presence of the A subtype. The finding ignited controversy, with contention that the sample DNA was insufficiently complete for the conclusion and that the result reflected modern contamination. However, a re-analysis indicated that the DNA sequences were consistent with, but not definitely from, the "cosmopolitan clade" (subtype A). The presence of subtypes A and B in the Americas is suggestive of a Native American source population related to the Ainu ancestors, the Jōmon.

==== Physical anthropology ====
Paleo-Indian skeletons in the Americas such as Kennewick Man (Washington State), Hoya Negro skeleton (Yucatán), Luzia Woman and other skulls from the Lagoa Santa site (Brazil), Buhl Woman (Idaho), Peñon Woman III, two skulls from the Tlapacoya site (Mexico City), and 33 skulls from Baja California have exhibited certain craniofacial traits distinct from most modern Native Americans, leading physical anthropologists to posit an earlier "Paleoamerican" population wave. The most basic measured distinguishing trait is the dolichocephaly of the skull. Some modern isolated populations, such as the Pericúes of Baja California and the Fuegians of Tierra del Fuego, exhibit that same morphological trait.

Other anthropologists advocate an alternative hypothesis that evolution of an original Beringian phenotype gave rise to a distinct morphology that was similar in all known Paleoamerican skulls, followed by later convergence towards the modern Native American phenotype.

Archaeogenetic studies do not support a two-wave model or the Paleoamerican hypothesis of an Australo-Melanesian origin; instead, they firmly assign all Paleo-Indians and modern Native Americans to a single ancient population that entered the Americas in a single migration from Beringia. Only in one ancient specimen (Lagoa Santa) and a few modern populations in the Amazon region, a small Australasian ancestry component of c. 3% was detected, which remains unexplained by the current state of research (as of 2021), but may be explained by the presence of the more basal Tianyuan-related ancestry, a deep East Asian lineage which did not directly contribute to modern East Asians but may have contributed to the ancestors of Native Americans in Siberia, as such ancestry is also found among previous Paleolithic Siberians (Ancient North Eurasians).

A report published in the American Journal of Physical Anthropology in January 2015 reviewed craniofacial variation, focusing on differences between early and late Native Americans and explanations for these based on either skull morphology or molecular genetics. Arguments based on molecular genetics have, in the main, according to the authors, accepted a single migration from Asia with a probable pause in Beringia and later bidirectional gene flow. Some studies focusing on craniofacial morphology have previously argued that Paleoamerican remains have been described as closer to Australo-Melanesians and Polynesians than to the modern series of Native Americans, suggesting two entries into the Americas, an early one occurring before a distinctive East Asian morphology developed (referred to in the paper as the "Two Components Model"). Another "third model", the "Recurrent Gene Flow" (RGF) model, attempts to reconcile the two, arguing that circumarctic gene flow after the initial migration could account for morphological changes. It specifically re-evaluates the original report on the Hoya Negro skeleton, which supported the RGF model; the authors disagreed with the original conclusion, which suggested that the skull shape did not match those of modern Native Americans, arguing that the "skull falls into a subregion of the morphospace occupied by both Paleoamericans and some modern Native Americans".

==== Stemmed points ====
Stemmed points are a lithic technology distinct from Beringian and Clovis types. They have a distribution ranging from coastal East Asia to the Pacific coast of South America. The emergence of stemmed points has been traced to Korea during the upper Paleolithic. The origin and distribution of stemmed points have been interpreted as a cultural marker related to a source population from coastal East Asia.

== Migration routes ==
=== Interior route ===
==== Clovis-First theory ====
Map demonstrating the routes of the competing "Ice Free Corridor" and "Coastal migration" hypotheses for human arrival into North America

Historically, theories about migration into the Americas have centered on movement from Beringia across the interior of North America. The discovery of artifacts associated with Pleistocene faunal remains near Clovis, New Mexico in the early 1930s required extending the timeframe for the settlement of North America to a period when glaciers were still extensive. That led to the hypothesis of a migration route between the Laurentide and Cordilleran ice sheets to explain the early settlement. The Clovis site was host to a lithic technology characterized by spear points with an indentation, or flute, where the point was attached to the shaft. A lithic complex characterized by the Clovis Point technology was subsequently identified over much of North America and in South America. The association of Clovis complex technology with late Pleistocene faunal remains led to the theory, known as the Clovis First theory, that it marked the arrival of big-game hunters who migrated out of Beringia and then dispersed throughout the Americas.

Recent radiocarbon dating of Clovis sites has yielded ages of between 13,000 and 12,600 BP, somewhat later than dates derived from older techniques. The re-evaluation of earlier radiocarbon dates led to the conclusion that no fewer than 11 of the 22 Clovis sites with radiocarbon dates are "problematic". It should be disregarded, including the type site in Clovis, New Mexico. Numerical dating of Clovis sites has allowed comparison of Clovis dates with those of other archaeological sites throughout the Americas and with the timing of the opening of the ice-free corridor. Both lead to significant challenges to the Clovis First theory. The Monte Verde site of Southern Chile has been dated at 14,800 BP. The Paisley Cave site in eastern Oregon yielded a 14,500 BP date on a coprolite with human DNA and radiocarbon dates of 13,200 and 12,900 BP on horizons containing western stemmed points. Artifact horizons with non-Clovis lithic assemblages and pre-Clovis ages occur in eastern North America, although the maximum ages tend to be poorly constrained.

Recent studies have suggested that the ice-free corridor opened later (around 13,800 ± 500 years ago) than the earliest widely accepted archaeological sites in the Americas, suggesting that it could not have been used as the route for the earliest peoples to migrate south.

An alternative to the Beringia route is proposed by the "stepping stones" hypothesis. The frequent submergence of islands along the Bering Transitory Archipelago would have forced the inhabitants of these islands to continue traveling across the archipelago until they reached the mainland.

==== Lithic evidence of pre-Clovis migrations ====
Geological findings on the timing of the ice-free corridor also challenge the notion that Clovis and pre-Clovis human occupation of the Americas resulted from migration through that route following the Last Glacial Maximum. Pre-LGM closing of the corridor may have occurred around 30,000 BP, and estimates of ice retreat from the corridor range from 13,000 to 12,000 years ago. Viability of the corridor as a human migration route has been estimated at 11,500 BP, later than the ages of the Clovis and pre-Clovis sites. Dated Clovis archaeological sites suggest a south-to-north spread of the Clovis culture.

Pre-LGM migration into the interior has been proposed to explain pre-Clovis ages for archaeological sites in the Americas, although pre-Clovis sites such as Meadowcroft Rock Shelter, Monte Verde, and Paisley Cave have not yielded confirmed pre-LGM ages.

There are many pre-Clovis sites in the American Southwest, particularly in the Mojave Desert. Lake Mojave quarries, dating back to the Pleistocene, contain lithic remains of projectile points from Silver Lake and Lake Mojave. This indicates an interior movement into the region as early as 13,800 BP, if not earlier.

==== Dené–Yeniseian language family proposal ====
A relationship between the Na-Dené languages of North America (such as Navajo and Apache) and the Yeniseian languages of Siberia was first proposed as early as 1923 and was later developed further by others. A detailed study was done by Edward Vajda and published in 2010. This theory received support from many linguists, with archaeological and genetic studies providing it with further support.

The Arctic Small Tool tradition of Alaska and the Canadian Arctic may have originated in East Siberia about 5,000 years ago. This is connected with the ancient Paleo-Eskimo peoples of the Arctic.

The Arctic Small Tool tradition source may have been the Syalakh-Bel'kachi-Ymyakhtakh culture sequence of East Siberia, dated to 6,500–2,800 BP.

The interior route is consistent with the spread of the Na-Dene language group and subhaplogroup X2a into the Americas after the earliest paleoamerican migration.

Nevertheless, some scholars suggest that the ancestors of Western North Americans speaking Na-Dene languages made a coastal migration by boat.

==== Earlier interior route ====
It is possible that humans arrived in the Americas via interior routes that existed before the Last Glacial Maximum. Cosmogenic exposure dating, a technique that analyzes when in Earth's history a landscape was exposed to cosmic rays (and therefore unglaciated), performed by Mark Swisher, suggests that an older ice-free corridor existed in North America 25,000 years ago. Swisher attributes sites such as Monte Verde, Meadowcroft Rockshelter, Manis Mastodon site, and Paisley Caves to this corridor.

=== Pacific coastal route ===
The Pacific coastal migration theory proposes that people first reached the Americas via maritime travel, following coastlines from northeast Asia into the Americas; it was originally proposed in 1979 by Knute Fladmark as an alternative to the hypothetical migration through an ice-free inland corridor. This model would help to explain the rapid spread to coastal sites extremely distant from the Bering Strait region, including sites such as Monte Verde in southern Chile and Taima-Taima in western Venezuela.

The very similar marine migration hypothesis is a variant of coastal migration; essentially, its only difference is that it postulates that boats were the principal means of travel. The proposed use of boats adds a measure of flexibility to the chronology of coastal migration, because a continuous ice-free coast (16–15,000 calibrated years BP) would then not be required: Migrants in boats could have easily bypassed ice barriers and settled in scattered coastal refugia, before the deglaciation of the coastal land route was complete. A maritime-competent source population in coastal East Asia is an essential part of the marine migration hypothesis.

A 2007 article in the Journal of Island and Coastal Archaeology proposed a "kelp highway hypothesis", a variant of coastal migration based on the exploitation of kelp forests along much of the Pacific Rim from Japan to Beringia, the Pacific Northwest, and California, and as far as the Andean Coast of South America. Once the coastlines of Alaska and British Columbia had deglaciated about 16,000 years ago, these kelp forests (along with estuarine, mangrove, and coral reef habitats) would have provided an ecologically homogeneous migration corridor, entirely at sea level and essentially unobstructed. A 2016 DNA analysis of plants and animals suggests a coastal route was feasible.

Mitochondrial subhaplogroup D4h3a, a rare subclade of D4h3 occurring along the west coast of the Americas, has been identified as a clade associated with coastal migration. This haplogroup was found in a skeleton referred to as Anzick-1, found in Montana in close association with several Clovis artifacts, dated 12,500 years ago.

==== Problems with evaluating coastal migration models ====
The coastal migration models provide a different perspective on migration to the New World, but they are not without their own problems: One such problem is that global sea levels have risen over 120 metres (390 ft) since the end of the last glacial period, and this has submerged the ancient coastlines that maritime people would have followed into the Americas. Finding sites associated with early coastal migrations is extremely difficult, and systematic excavation of any sites found in deeper waters is challenging and expensive. Strategies for finding the earliest migration sites include identifying potential sites on submerged paleoshorelines, seeking sites in areas uplifted either by tectonics or isostatic rebound, and looking for riverine sites in areas that may have attracted coastal migrants. On the other hand, there is evidence of marine technologies found in the hills of the Channel Islands of California, circa 12,000 BP.

== See also ==
- Early human migrations
- Genetic history of Indigenous peoples of the Americas
- List of first human settlements
- Population history of Indigenous peoples of the Americas
- Pre-Columbian transoceanic contact theories
