= Barton Village Site =

Coordinates: 39°33′45″N 78°51′2″W

- U.S. National Register of Historic Places
- Location within Maryland Location within the United States
- Nearest city: Cumberland, Maryland
- NRHP reference No.: 75000860
- Added to NRHP: May 12, 1975

Barton Village Site, also known as the Herman Barton Indian Village Archeological Site, is a large, multi-component archaeological site near Cumberland in Allegany County, Maryland.

== History of research ==
The site was explored in 1960 by Henry Wright, whose work revealed six cultural layers representing three phases of late prehistoric occupation, c. 1000-1500. It represents data for the terminal Woodland to the terminal Prehistoric periods in the Upper Potomac River Valley. Significant evidence exists that the site was a village of the Monongahela culture.

It was listed on the National Register of Historic Places in 1975.

The site was purchased from John Barton in 2002 by the Archaeological Conservancy.

=== Archaic period ===
This large, multi-component site also features some Archaic period occupations dating to the beginning of the Holocene. The human settlement here appears to have been continuous for at least 12,000 years.

The early lithic assemblage is represented by the finds of debitage as well as cores, and tools surrounding a hearth. Bifaces, scrapers, and flake tools were discovered. Locally available Shriver chert was used for manufacturing these tools.

The North Branch of the Potomac River seems to contain numerous other prehistoric settlements similar to Barton. In particular, the Black Oak area, 9 km south of Barton, where very little work has been done as yet, seems promising. Similar cultural deposits may be found there.

The Flint Run Archeological District, and in particular the Lockhart site (44WR20) is another similar location. This is a quarry-related site where jasper was processed.

== See also ==
- Meadowcroft Rockshelter
