= Albert Goodyear =

American archaeologist

Albert C. Goodyear III is an American archaeologist who is founder and director of the Allendale PaleoIndian Expedition in South Carolina, where he has unearthed evidence that may greatly move back the date of occupation of North America by humans to 50,000 years or more before the present. His area of expertise includes the Clovis culture which dates back about 13,000 years in North America.

Goodyear has been a professor at the South Carolina Institute of Archaeology and Anthropology, a branch of the University of South Carolina since 1974. He has a bachelor's degree from the University of South Florida, a master's from the University of Arkansas, and a PhD from Arizona State University.

The Allendale, South Carolina site, known as the Topper site, which has had ongoing excavations for several years, has unearthed many artifacts, as it was a long lasting site of human occupation due to an outcrop of chert, which was valuable for making stone tools.

Goodyear has authored over 100 articles and other publications and is a frequent lecturer on paleo-Indian archaeology.
