= Meadowcroft Rockshelter =

Archaeological site near Avella, Pennsylvania, US

- U.S. National Register of Historic Places
- U.S. National Historic Landmark
- Pennsylvania state historical marker
- Washington County History & Landmarks Foundation Landmark
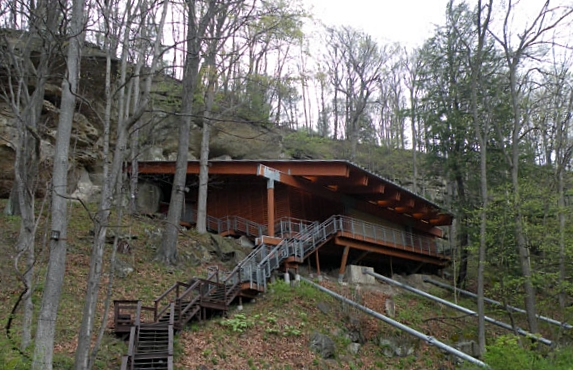
- Meadowcroft Rockshelter in Jefferson Township, Pennsylvania, U.S.

- Location within Pennsylvania Location within the United States
- Location: Jefferson Township, Washington County, Pennsylvania, U.S.
- Nearest city: Avella, Pennsylvania
- Coordinates: 40°17′11″N 80°29′30″W
- Area: 0.2 acres (0.081 ha)
- NRHP reference No.: 78002480

Significant dates
- Added to NRHP: November 21, 1978
- Designated NHL: April 5, 2005
- Designated PHMC: September 19, 1999

The Meadowcroft Rockshelter is an archaeological site which is located near Avella in Jefferson Township, Pennsylvania. The site is a rock shelter in a bluff overlooking Cross Creek (a tributary of the Ohio River), and contains evidence that the area may have been continually inhabited for at least 16,000 years and up to 19,000 years. If accurately dated, it would be one of the earliest known sites with evidence of a human presence and continuous human occupation in the New World.

The site is located twenty-seven miles west-southwest of Pittsburgh in the Pittsburgh metropolitan area.

The site operates as a division of the Heinz History Center of Pittsburgh and has a museum and a reconstruction of a circa 1570s Monongahela culture Indian village. Meadowcroft Rockshelter is recognized as a National Historic Landmark, a Pennsylvania Commonwealth Treasure, and as an official project of Save America's Treasures.

== Geology and location ==
The rockshelter is a natural formation beneath an overhanging cliff of Morgantown-Connellsville sandstone, which is a thick Pennsylvanian-age sandstone, brown in color. Meadowcroft is in the Allegheny Plateau, northwest of the Appalachian Basin.

== Archaeology ==
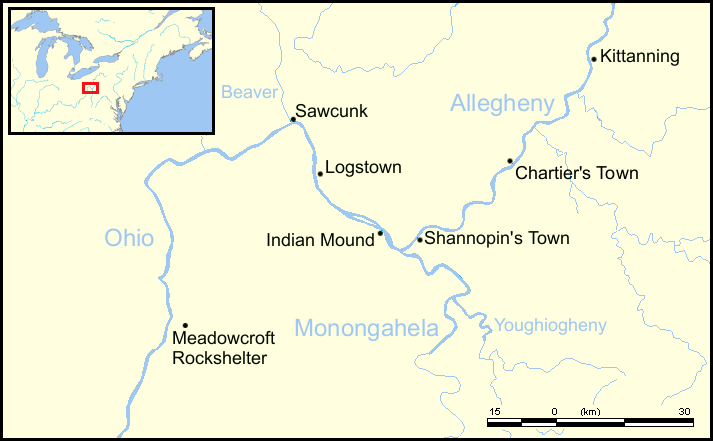
Meadowcroft Rockshelter and other Native American points of interest in Southwestern Pennsylvania

=== Excavations ===
Native Americans left the site during the American Revolutionary War. It was not rediscovered until many years later, when, in 1955, Albert Miller found the first artifacts in a groundhog burrow. Miller delayed reporting his findings so as to not attract vandals, until he contacted James M. Adovasio, who led the first excavations of the site in 1973 until 1979 by the Cultural Resource Management Program of the University of Pittsburgh. Further University of Pittsburgh field school excavations were conducted through 1989. Since the 1990s, more recent work has also been undertaken by Adovasio through the Mercyhurst Archaeological Institute. The methods of excavation used at Meadowcroft are still seen as state-of-the-art. It is viewed as one of the most carefully excavated sites in North America.

=== Finds ===
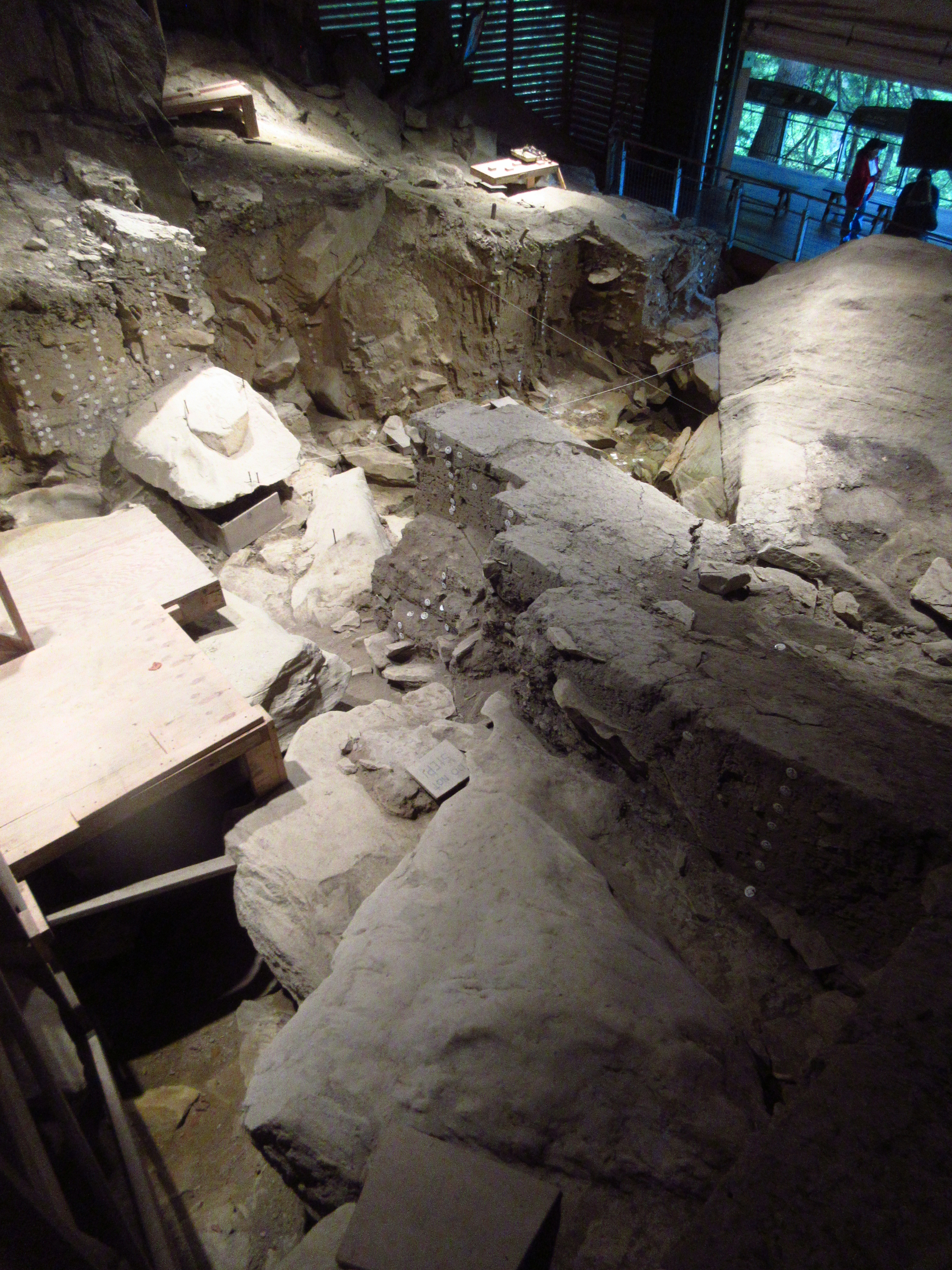
Inside the shelter

Meadowcroft has produced what may be pre-Clovis remains, found as deep as 11.5 feet underground. The site also has yielded many tools, including pottery, bifaces, bifacial fragments, lamellar blades, a lanceolate projectile point, and chipping debris. Recoveries of note also include fluted points, which are a marker of the Paleoindian period. Remains of flint from Ohio, jasper from eastern Pennsylvania and marine shells from the Atlantic coast suggest that the people inhabiting the area were mobile and involved in long-distance trade. At least one basin-shaped hearth was reused over time.

Meadowcroft has also yielded the largest collection of flora and fauna materials ever recovered from a location in eastern North America. The arid environment provided the necessary and rare conditions that permitted excellent botanical preservation. In total, animal remains representing 149 species were excavated. Evidence shows that people gathered smaller game animals as well as plants, such as corn, squash, fruits, nuts, and seeds.

=== Dating ===
Radiocarbon dating of the site indicated occupancy beginning 16,000 years ago (14,000 BCE) and possibly as early as 19,000 years ago (17,000 BCE). However, the dates are still controversial. A recent (2013) survey carried out by the Society for American Archaeology reported support from 38% of archaeologists, with 20% rejecting the early dates. Criticism of these early radiocarbon dates has focused on the potential for contamination by ancient carbon from coal-bearing strata in the watershed. The samples, tested by an independent third party geomorphologist, concluded that the samples showed no evidence of groundwater activity. Tests performed via accelerator mass spectrometry also support the earlier dates. Proponents of the notion that contamination occurred note that the alkali-soluble humates in charcoal samples from the site are older than the charcoal in the samples. If authentic, these dates would indicate that Meadowcroft was used in the pre-Clovis era and, as such, provides evidence for very early human habitation of the Americas. Meadowcroft Rockshelter may be one of the oldest known sites of human habitation in North America, providing a unique glimpse into the lives of prehistoric hunters and gatherers. Paleoindian, Archaic, and Woodland remains have all been found at the site.

=== Miller complex ===
An unusual type of arrowhead was found at the site, which has been named the Miller Lanceolate projectile point. Similar unfluted lanceolate points have also been found at the adjacent sites. As Goodyear writes:

Enough lithic artifacts were recovered to define the Miller complex. This complex consists of thin bifaces, including one lanceolate point, the Miller Lanceolate; small prismatic blades; retouched flake tools and blades, and debitage related to late-stage core and biface reduction and tool kit maintenance.

The Miller complex is further defined by surveys done in the Cross Creek watershed, where other lanceolate points, small prismatic blades, and small polyhedral blade cores have been recovered. According to Adovasio et al., this complex has a Eurasiatic and Siberian appearance. These authors also note that small blades and polyhedral cores are absent from subsequent Paleoindian fluted-point assemblages in this region, reinforcing the technological distinctiveness of the Miller complex.

The adjacent Krajacic Site is located about ten miles southeast of Meadowcroft, and it is also important in defining the Miller complex. This site yielded a great variety of distinctive Meadowcroft-style blade implements and several small, cylindrical polyhedral cores.

At Cactus Hill in Virginia, similar points have been found, where they are dubbed as the Early Triangular type. Some similar finds were made at the Page-Ladson site in Florida as well.

Because of the very long occupational sequence at Meadowcroft, it became a very important site and is seen as quite valuable for comparative analysis:

The Pre-Clovis artifacts from Meadowcroft Rockshelter include a lanceolate point (named the Miller Lanceolate), bifaces, unifaces, prismatic blades, core fragments, and debitage. Remains from other Pre-Clovis sites (e.g., Cactus Hill and Saltville, Virginia, Topper, South Carolina, etc.) are usually compared to the Meadowcroft assemblage. In addition, claims for Pre-Clovis inhabitants in other sections of the New World also are evaluated with Meadowcroft in mind.

According to some scholars, Clovis, Folsom, and other fluted point complexes may have derived from such unfluted lanceolate points.

=== Other relevant sites in the northeastern United States ===
Other sites in the northeastern United States with evidence of possible pre-Clovis human presence include: Burning Tree Mastodon (Ohio), Mitchell Farm (Delaware), Barton (Barton Village Site, Maryland), Miles Point, and Parsons Island.

== Tourism and historical designations ==
Renovations to the rock shelter in 2008 were made so that visitors can see some of the tools and campfires made by the first Americans thousands of years ago. The rockshelter is recognized as a Pennsylvania Commonwealth Treasure and is an official project of Save America's Treasures. The historic site also includes a recreation of a 16th-century Monongahela village as well as 18th and 19th century buildings from European and United States settlement.

The site was listed on the National Register of Historic Places in 1978. In 1999, the Pennsylvania Historical and Museum Commission installed a historical marker noting the historic importance of the site. It was designated a National Historic Landmark in 2005. It is also designated as a historic public landmark by the Washington County History & Landmarks Foundation.

== See also ==
- Chiquihuite cave – Possible Upper Paleolithic archaeological site in Zacatecas, Mexico
- List of Native American archaeological sites on the National Register of Historic Places in Pennsylvania
- List of National Historic Landmarks in Pennsylvania

== Citations ==
- Meadowcroft Rockshelter and Museum of Rural Life
- "The Greatest Journey," James Shreeve, National Geographic, March 2006, p. 64. Shows dates 19,000 to 12,000 years ago; as well as Clovis (13,500 years ago) and Monte Verde 14,800 years ago.
- Heinz History Center
