= Topper site =

Archaeological site in South Carolina, US

- Interactive map of Topper site

Topper is an archaeological site located along the Savannah River in Allendale County, South Carolina, United States. It is noted as a location of artifacts which some archaeologists believe to indicate human habitation of the New World earlier than the Clovis culture. The latter were previously believed to be the first people in North America.

Artifacts at this site may predate Clovis by 3,000 years or more, but their human manufacture has not been conclusively demonstrated. The primary excavation has gone down to a level that dates to at least 50,000 B.C.E., searching for evidence of cultural artifacts. Until increasing challenges in the first decade of the 21st century to the Clovis theory based on this site and others, it was unusual for archaeologists to dig deeper than the layer of the Clovis culture, as they then believed that no human artifacts would be found older than Clovis.

== Geography ==
The Topper site lies along the eastern side of the Savannah River. The site is somewhat hilly: the lowest section lies along the river at an elevation between 80 feet (24 m) and 90 feet (27 m), while the highest is the site's eastern edge, which rises above 130 feet (40 m). A chute channel runs through the site to the river. The site measures approximately 0.1 miles (0.16 km) east-west and slightly more than half of that distance north–south, although the full extent of the archaeological deposits has not yet been determined. The site is a chert quarry. The chert-bearing Flint River Formation is exposed on the slope above the Savannah River, at the northernmost point of the formation. Stone suitable for forming into tools is scarce north and east of Topper, making the site attractive for hunter-gatherers from that area. Part of the site is on a fluvial terrace above the river and below the chert-bearing outcrop. Three major depositional units have been uncovered in excavations on the terrace. The lowest is a sand and sandy clay layer believed to have been laid down by a meandering river prior to 55,000 years ago. Above that is a 1.5 metres (4.9 ft) thick layer of gravel, sand and sandy silty clay, thought to have been deposited by braided streams prior to 15,000 years ago. Starting about 13,000 years ago a 1 metre (3.3 ft) thick layer of silty sand was deposited by wind and surface water flow and soil creep from hillside above the terrace. In the late Pleistocene the Topper site was near the juncture of two ecosystems. To the north was a cool, mesic, deciduous forest. To the south was a warmer evergreen forest.

The Topper site, identified by site code 38AL23, is included in the Allendale Chert Quarries Archeological District, which is on the National Register of Historic Places. It is located on land that was previously owned by the Clariant company, and ownership was transferred to Archroma in 2013. In 2006, a pavilion was built over the Pleistocene terrace, which protects excavators from sun and rain. The Clariant company also contributed to the funding for the pavilion, built a viewing deck overlooking the excavation site on the terrace. Two areas at the site have yielded Clovis material: on the terrace next to the chute, and an area on the hillside slope above the chert-bearing outcrop. As of 2013, 840 square metres (9,000 sq ft) had been excavated down to Clovis bearing material, or deeper.

== Investigations ==
The Topper site was excavated in 1985 and 1986 by the South Carolina Institute of Archaeology and Anthropology (SCIAA). Those excavations found artifacts ranging from 15th-century Mississippian culture to presumed Paleoindian provenance. In 1998, the Allendale Paleoindian Expedition, (Note: The Allendale Paleoindian Expedition was a program that allowed members of the public to participate in archaeological excavations conducted by the South Carolina Institute of Archaeology and Anthropology. The program operated from 1996 until 2004. It was renamed the Southeastern Paleoindian Survey in 2005, and continued at least through 2020.) under the direction of Albert Goodyear, was scheduled to work on the Smiths Lake Creek site on the Savannah River. Flooding at that site forced the project to move to the Topper site. The previous excavations had not found any artifacts below the top 100 centimetres (39 in) from the ground surface, with evidence of fluted points (possibly Clovis or Folsom points) at the 90 to 100 centimetres (35 to 39 in) level. In hopes of finding pre-Clovis artifacts, the 1998 excavation was extended below the 100 centimetres (39 in) level. Chert fragments, some of which were interpreted as artifacts (resulting from human action) and lumps of charcoal were found from 130 to 210 centimetres (51 to 83 in) below the surface, well below the layer identified as Paleoindian or Clovis. A cluster of about 20 rocks found at the 180 centimetres (71 in) level was interpreted as a possible cultural feature.

Excavations were conducted at Topper each year after 1998, and have concentrated on two areas, an area on the terrace referred to as the "Pleistocene terrace", and an area on the slope above the terrace, called "Hillside". In 2006, a pavilion was built over the Pleistocene terrace, which protects excavators from sun and rain.

== Clovis finds ==
Two areas at the Topper site, the "Pleistocene terrace" and the "hillside", have yielded a substantial number of Clovis artifacts from intact buried deposits. As of 2005, only one other Clovis site (Cactus Hill) on the Atlantic Coastal Plain had been excavated.

=== Hillside ===
The hillside is a sloping sheet of sand overlain by loamy sand covering part of the alluvial terrace. A total of 210 square metres (2,300 sq ft) have been excavated on the hillside. One 40 square metres (430 sq ft) area on the slope of the hill above the terrace was excavated from 2005 through 2008, down to 50 to 85 centimetres (20 to 33 in) below the modern surface. The soil in the excavated area was not stratified, but Clovis, Archaic, and Woodland artifacts were found in distinct layers, Woodland artifacts in the upper level, Archaic artifacts in the middle, and Clovis artifacts in the lowest excavated level. Analysis of the distribution of artifacts, combined with assessment of patination, evidence of heat treatment, and other aspects of appearance, indicates that there had been minimal disturbance of the stratification of artifacts.

== Clovis culture ==
Since the 1930s, the prevailing theory concerning the peopling of the New World is that the first human inhabitants were the Clovis people, who are thought to have appeared approximately 13,500 years ago. Artifacts of the Clovis people are found throughout most of the United States and as far south as Panama in Central America. Since the early 21st century, this standard theory has been challenged based on the discovery and dating of pre-Clovis sites such as Monte Verde in Southern Chile, Cactus Hill in Virginia, and Buttermilk Creek in Texas.

== Pre Clovis dispute ==
In 2004, Albert Goodyear of the University of South Carolina announced that carbonized plant remains, found as a dark stain in the light soil at the lowest excavated level at the Topper Site, had been radiocarbon dated to approximately 50,000 years ago, or approximately 37,000 years before the Clovis people. Goodyear, who began excavating the Topper site in the 1980s, believes that lithic objects at that level are rudimentary stone tools (and thus "artifacts"). Other archaeologists dispute this conclusion, suggesting that the objects are natural and not human-made. Some archaeologists also have challenged the radiocarbon dating of the carbonized remains at Topper, arguing that 1) the stain represented the result of a natural fire, and 2) 50,000 years is the theoretical upper limit of effective radiocarbon dating, meaning that the stratum is radiocarbon dead, rather than dating to that time period. Goodyear discovered the objects by digging 4 meters deeper than the Clovis artifacts readily found at the site. Before discovering the oldest lithics, he had discovered other objects which he claimed were tools dating around 16,000 years old, or about 3,000 years before Clovis.

According to Dean Snow, this assertion of 3,000 years is a much more likely and plausible number than the upper limit of radiocarbon dating. Evidence predating Clovis culture by a few thousand years is popularly termed as the "pioneer" stage of Clovis culture. This would be the birth of the culture and the start of the tool set. Researchers agree that the lack of evidence would stem from the lack of materials at hand. New techniques would take time to spread. The pioneer hypothesis allows for tools to predate by centuries rather than millennia.

Waters, et al. state that the proposed artifacts found below the Clovis horizon at the Topper site may be natural rather than man-made. They note that the posited tools remained unchanged over the period from 50,000 years Before Present (B.P.) until 15,000 years B.P., unlike the changing assemblages of tools in the Late Pleistocene and Holocene strata at the site.

== Sources ==
- Goodyear, Albert C. (August 1984). "Allendale Chert Quarries Archeological District" (PDF). National Register of Historic Places - Nomination and Inventory.
- Goodyear, Albert C. (July 1998). "The Return of the 1998 Allendale Paleoindian Expedition: The Search for Some Even Earlier South Carolinians". 3 (2): 8–10 – via University of South Carolina Scholar Commons.
- Goodyear, Albert (2005). "Evidence of Pre-Clovis Sites in the Eastern United States". In Bonnichsen, Robson; Lepper, Bradley T.; Stanford, Dennis; Waters, Michael R. (eds.). Paleoamerican Origins: Beyond Clovis. Texas A&M University Press. pp. 103–112 – via University of South Carolina Scholar Commons.
- Goodyear, Albert C. (September 2006). "The Southeastern Paleoamerican Survey" (PDF). Legacy. 10 (2): 16–19 – via University of South Carolina Scholar Commons.
- Goodyear, Albert (April 1, 2007). "The Topper Site Pavilion Celebration". Legacy. 11 (1): 12–13.
- Goodyear, Alfred C. (March 2009). "Update on Research at the Topper Site". Legacy. 13 (1): 8–13 – via University of South Carolina Scholar Commons.
- Goodyear, Albert C. (September 2020). "Update on the Activities of the Southeastern Paleoamerican Survey (2014-2020)". Legacy. 24: 17–22 – via University of South Carolina Scholar Commons.
- Smallwood, Ashley M. (2010). "Clovis Biface Technology at the Topper Site, South Carolina: Evidence for Variation and Technological Flexibility" (PDF). Journal of Archaeological Science. 37: 2413–2425. Archived from the original (PDF) on March 4, 2016.
- Smallwood, Ashley (February 2015). "Context and spatial organization of the Clovis assemblage from the Topper site, South Carolina". Journal of Field Archaeology. 40 (1): 69–88. doi:10.1179/0093469014Z.000000000106. JSTOR 24408763.
- Smallwood, Ashley; Goodyear, Albert (2009-01-01). "Reworked Clovis Biface Distal Fragments from the Topper Site, 38AL23: Implications for Clovis Technological Organization in the Central Savannah River Region". Current Research in the Pleistocene. 26: 118–120 – via University of South Carolina Scholar Commons.
- Waters, Michael R.; Forman, Steven L.; Stafford, Thomas W.; Foss, John (July 1, 2009). "Geoarchaeological investigations at the Topper and Big Pine Tree sites, Allendale County, South Carolina". Journal of Archaeological Science. 36 (7): 1300–1311. doi:10.1016/j.jas.2008.12.020. ISSN 0305-4403.
- University of South Carolina (November 18, 2004). "New Evidence Puts Man in North America 50,000 Years Ago". Science Daily. Archived from the original on April 6, 2023.
