= Cactus Hill =

Archaeological site in southeastern Virginia, United States

Coordinates: 36.9880°N 77.3210°W

Cactus Hill is an archaeological site in southeastern Virginia, United States, located on sand dunes above the Nottoway River about 45 miles south of Richmond. The site receives its name from the prickly pear cacti that can be found growing abundantly on-site in the sandy soil. Cactus Hill may be one of the oldest archaeological sites in the Americas. If proven to have been inhabited 16,000 to 20,000 years ago, it would provide supporting evidence for pre-Clovis occupation of the Americas. The site has yielded multiple levels of prehistoric occupation with two discrete levels of early Paleo-Indian activity, one of which corresponds to possible Clovis period occupation.

== Significance ==
Many archaeologists, including Dennis Stanford and Joseph and Lynn McAvoy of Nottoway River Survey, consider the Cactus Hill site to furnish evidence of a pre-Clovis population in North America. They regard Cactus Hill as significant because it challenges previously established models of Paleoindian migration.

The Clovis first hypothesis which most anthropologists now reject, is the argument that the people associated with the Clovis culture were the first widespread inhabitants of the Americas. In 1933, this view was supported by the discovery of a flint spearhead found at Clovis, New Mexico. A mammoth skeleton that was laid next to the spearhead was dated as being from 11,500 BP. At the time, this was one of the earliest indications of human activity in the Americas. The evidence suggested that the introduction of the Clovis point coincided with the extinction of the megafauna on the continent; furthermore, it was believed that these people came to the Americas from Siberia through the Bering land bridge – a stretch of land that resulted from low sea levels during the Wisconsin glaciation. It is hypothesized that this allowed for migration between 14,500 and 14,000 BP. In February 2014, as published in Nature, researchers reported on the results of DNA analysis of Anzick boy, a Clovis-era skeleton, supported this theory in two directions: his DNA showed a connection to an estimated 80 percent of the Native Americans in both the Americas, as well as being connected to ancestral peoples in Siberia or northeast Asia.

The entire theory concerning the first inhabitants being the Clovis culture was reevaluated following the discoveries at Cactus Hill in the mid-1990s. With the emergence of new evidence, the hypothesis for a pre-Clovis human occupation began to surface. A 2008 DNA study suggested "a complex model for the peopling of the Americas, in which the initial differentiation from Asian populations ended with a moderate bottleneck in Beringia during the last glacial maximum (LGM), around approximately 23,000 to approximately 19,000 years ago. Toward the end of the LGM, a strong population expansion started approximately 18,000 and finished approximately 15,000 years ago. These results support a pre-Clovis occupation of the New World, suggesting a rapid settlement of the continent along a Pacific coastal route." Another Pre-Clovis site, Page-Ladson, has since been discovered in Florida and many scientists now believe that first Americans probably arrived by boat, long before the Bering land bridge became ice free.

== Discoveries ==
Several inches of sand lie between the Clovis-era deposit and a lower level. This lower level, attributed to a pre-Clovis time period, includes:

- Two Clovis points. Microwear on the points indicates that hafting was used. Fractures on the tips have been interpreted as meaning that they were projectiles that broke on impact.
- Blades. Microwear indicates that they were hafted and used for butchering and hide processing.
- Elevated phosphate levels, an indication of human occupation
- An ample amount of phytoliths, which were further analyzed and determined to come from carbonized hickory wood
- 20 specimens of faunal remains, of those identifiable include: ten turtle shell fragments, two whitetail deer toe bone fragments, and five fossil shark's teeth

== Site integrity ==
A 2022 research paper suggested that Cactus Hill might have "a stratigraphically discrete occupation below Clovis". The authors then state data supporting the conclusion of separate layers of occupation had not yet been published (though research had been presented in April of 2000 supporting the pre-Clovis assessment) and geological soils have the potential to yield inconsistent stratigraphy. Tests were conducted on the Cactus Hill site that corroborate its generally-accepted era dates. James C. Baker of Virginia Tech conducted soil analysis that indicated that the formation of the site consisted of wind-blown sand deposits and further research by James Feathers of the University of Washington confirmed that the buried sand levels had been undisturbed by later deposits. Along with this, paleoethnobotanist Lucinda McWeeney of Yale University identified charred plant remains. From this, she was able to identify a correlation between the stone artifacts and plant use at the site. The correlation indicates that the human occupation levels at the site have not been mixed. Dr. Carol Mandryk of Harvard University performed tests for the area that produced the 15,000-year-old date that showed relative stratigraphic integrity. Her tests at another area of the site failed to show proof that the sediments had not been disturbed.

Research done by Richard I. Macphail of the Institute of Archaeology in London and Joseph M. McAvoy of The Nottoway River Survey contributed to the integrity discussion using a micromorphological analysis of the stratigraphy of the site. Their micromorphological observations, along with previous analyses, confirmed a series of conclusions on the integrity of Cactus Hill. They found that the formation of dunes may have been interspersed with the brief formation of a fine, phytolith-rich topsoil. As humans lived on these brief topsoil layers, they deposited artifacts and charcoal. Similarly, animals were present, which added to the dispersal and mixing of fine soil into sand dunes through their burrowing practices. The stratified sequence that can be seen today is the result of sedimentation that was interrupted by erosional processes like deflation. That sequence, based on the small-scale animal disturbance in a thin section of the strata, was most likely stable for millions of years. According to Macphail and McAvoy's analysis, it appears that the site is intact with only a few minor disturbances that could affect the long-term integrity of the site's stratigraphy. David Madsen remains skeptical of these results due to a lack of relation between the sediment layers that OSL dating was performed on and the portion of the site containing human artifacts and due to a lack of assessment of the radiocarbon dates from the site.

== Controversy ==
Many hypotheses began to arise as a result of this pre-Clovis evidence. One such hypothesis is advocated by Dennis Stanford. In what is known as the Solutrean hypothesis, he suggests that European Solutreans migrated to the Americas across the Atlantic Ocean. The supporting evidence for this hypothesis includes the discovery of artifacts at Cactus Hill dated to the time period between the Clovis and Solutrean and, perhaps just as strongly, evidence of the same technology used between the two cultures. According to Dr. Bruce Bradley, "the Cactus Hill flint was a technological midpoint between the French Solutrean style and the Clovis points dating five millennia later." The major criticism to this hypothesis is that there is simply not enough evidence to support it. In their journal article, Lawrence Guy Straus, David J. Meltzer, and Ted Goebel claim, "We believe that the many differences between Solutrean and Clovis are far more significant than the few similarities, the latter being readily explained by the well-known phenomenon of technological convergence or parallelism." The Solutrean hypothesis is generally disregarded by mainstream archeologists.
