= Monte Verde =

Archaeological site in Llanquihue Province, Chile

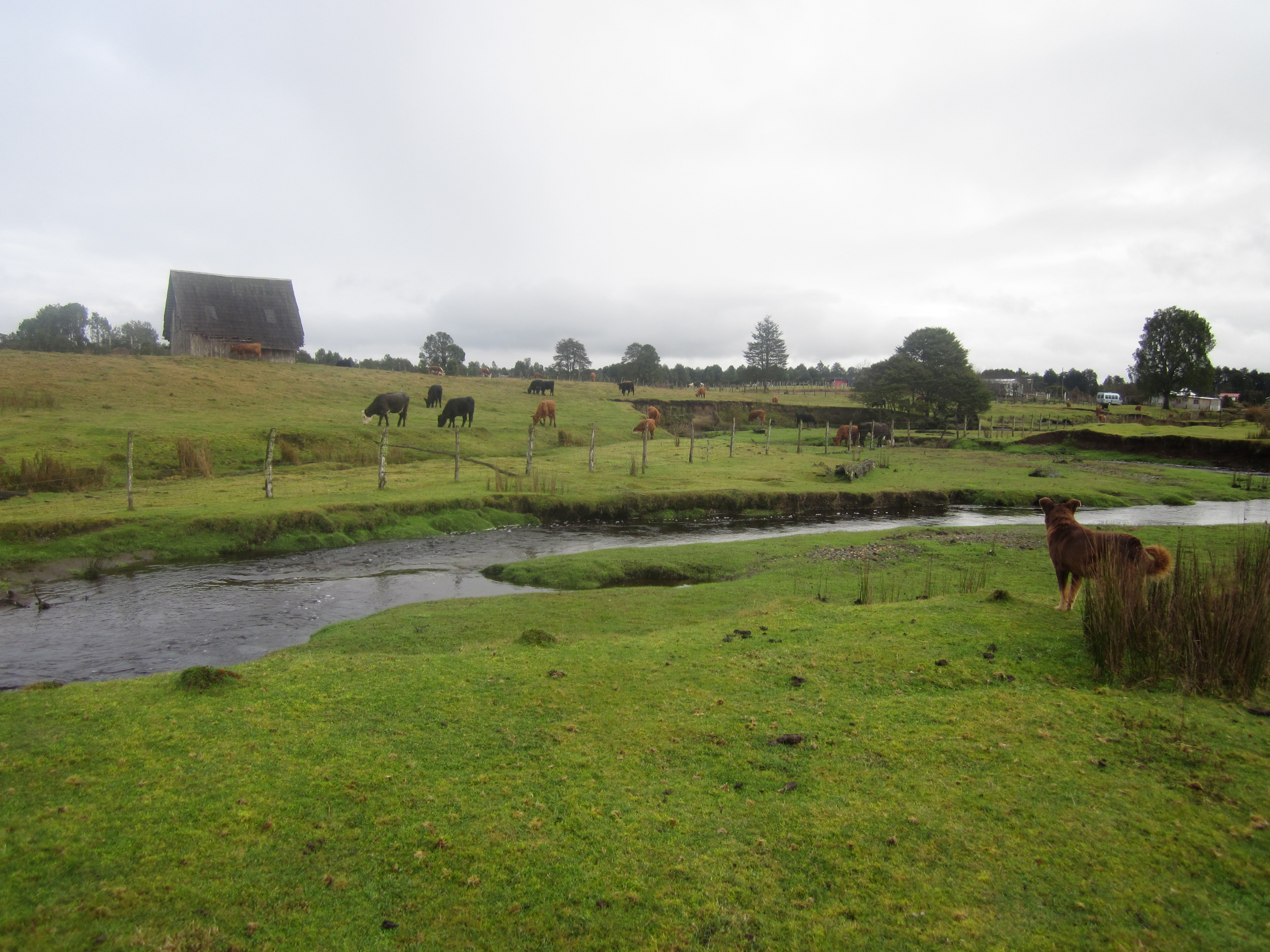
- View of Monte Verde and Chinchihuapi Creek in 2012

- Shown within Chile
- 41°30′17″S 73°12′16″W
- Type: open-air
- Location: Southern Chile

Monte Verde is a Paleolithic archaeological site in the Llanquihue Province in southern Chile, located near Puerto Montt, Los Lagos Region. The site is primarily known for Monte Verde II, generally suggested to date to 14,500 years ago, which has been largely accepted (though not without dissent) as showing that the human settlement of the Americas predates the Clovis culture by at least 1,000 years, contrary to the now discredited "Clovis first" paradigm. The site also contains an older, much more controversial layer (Monte Verde I) suggested to date to 18,500 cal BP (16,500 BC), that lacks the general acceptance of Monte Verde II.

Monte Verde II represents a campsite with wooden tent-like structures that was later covered by a bog, sealing the site under a layer of anaerobic peat. The occupants of the site made rope and utilized animal skins, and consumed a variety of plant foods, including seaweed (despite the site being 60 kilometres (37 mi) from the ocean at the time), tubers, seeds, fruits and nuts. Remains at the site suggest that the occupants also butchered now extinct megafauna, including the gomphothere (elephant-relative) Notiomastodon and the llama Palaeolama. Surovell et al. (2026) argued that the campsite itself is middle Holocene (no older than 8,200 years BP), and that Pleistocene elements found within the site had been redeposited. The conclusions of this study have been contested by other scholars. Other sites have been reported elsewhere in the Americas of similar and generally accepted pre-Clovis age to Monte Verde II, including Paisley Caves and Cooper's Ferry.

Paleoecological evidence of the coastal landscape's ability to sustain human life has been used to support a "coastal migration" model for the initial peopling of the Americas. Dating of rock surfaces and animal bones suggests the coastal corridor was deglaciated and became habitable after 17,000 years BP. Although testing coastal migration theories can be difficult due to sea level rise since the Last Glacial Maximum, archaeologists are increasingly willing to accept the possibility that the initial settlement of the Americas occurred via coastlines.

== History ==
=== Discovery ===
The site was discovered in late 1975 when a veterinary student visited the area of Monte Verde, where severe erosion was occurring due to logging. Prior to the logging, the site itself had been preserved well due to the favorable conditions created by the Chinchihuapi creek banks. The student was shown a strange "cow bone" collected by nearby farmers who had found it exposed in the eroded Chinchihuapi Creek. The bone later proved to be from Notiomastodon, a gomphothere related to modern elephants. Tom Dillehay, an American anthropologist and professor at the Universidad Austral de Chile at the time, started excavating Monte Verde in 1977.

The site is situated on the banks of Chinchihuapi Creek, a tributary of the Maullín River located 36 miles (58 km) from the Pacific Ocean. One of the rare open-air prehistoric sites found so far in the Americas, Monte Verde was well preserved because it was located in an anaerobic bog environment near the creek. A short time after the site was originally occupied, the waters of the creek rose and a peat-filled bog formed that inhibited the bacterial decay of organic material and preserved many perishable artifacts and other items for millennia.

Radiocarbon dating of bones and charcoal in 1982 gave the site an average age of 14,800 BP, more than 1,000 years earlier than the oldest-known site of human habitation in the Americas at that time.

In the initial excavation, two large hearths and many small ones were found. The remains of local animals were discovered, in addition to wooden posts from approximately twelve huts. Scraps of clothing made of hide were also found. This led archaeologists to estimate the population was around 20–30 inhabitants. A human footprint was also observed in the clay, probably from a 70 kg (150 lb) adult.

=== Stratigraphy ===
The area consists of four distinct sites, Monte Verde I, Monte Verde II, Chinchihuapi I, and Chinchihuapi II.

The Monte Verde site has two distinct levels. The date of the upper level, MV-II, has been suggested to be the Late Pleistocene by Dillehay and colleagues, though other researchers suggested that it cannot be older than the middle Holocene.

The lower level, MV-I, is less well understood. It was more ephemeral, having come from ancient river sediments. Dillehay found charcoal scatters which may have been the remains of fireplaces next to stone and wood artifacts. These were dated to at least 33,000BP. He acknowledges MV-I has issues, such as uncertain artifacts, doubtful radiocarbon dates, and unreliable contexts. He hesistates to accept this level without additional evidence, including sites of similar age in the Americas.

==== Monte Verde I (MV-I) ====
Monte Verde I is located under an outwash plain, which formed during the last glaciation. It is not directly below MV-II. It was first concluded to be a site of human occupation because of three clay-lined burned areas and 26 stones, 13 of which may have been modified by humans. In 2013, Dillehay and his team returned to perform another excavation at Monte Verde due to the inadequate previous excavations. In 2015, Monte Verde I was re-dated to around 18,500 to 14,500 BP. Charcoal remains, charred animal bone fragments and several lithic artifacts, about 34% of which were derived from non-local sources, were discovered. The older end of this range is controversial, however, as it is based on putative lithic tools which some have suggested are instead naturally occurring objects.

==== Monte Verde II (MV-II) ====
The site is suggested to have been occupied by about twenty to thirty people. A twenty-foot-long tent-like structure of wood and animal hides was erected on the banks of the creek and was framed with logs and planks staked in the ground, making walls of poles covered with animal hides. Using ropes made of local reeds, the hides were tied to the poles creating separate living quarters within the main structure. Outside the tent-like structure, two large hearths had been built for community usage, most probably for tool making and craftwork.

Each of the living quarters had a brazier pit lined with clay. Around those hearths, many stone tools and remnants of spilled seeds, nuts, and berries were found. A 13,000-year-old specimen of the wild potato, Solanum maglia, was also found at the site; these remains, the oldest on record for any species of potato, wild or cultivated, suggest that southern Chile was one of the two main centres for the evolution of Solanum tuberosum tuberosum, the common potato. Remains of forty-five different edible plant species were found within the site, over a fifth of them originating from up to 150 miles (240 km) away. This suggested that the people of Monte Verde either had traded on or traveled regularly in this extended network.

Other important finds from this site include human coprolites, a footprint, assumed to have been made by a child, stone tools, and cordage. Dr. Dillehay obtained the date for this site by radiocarbon dating charcoal and bone found within the site.

At Monte Verde II, seven partial carcasses of Notiomastodon, alongside remains of a single individual of the extinct llama Palaeolama show evidence of butchery, with some of these carcasses having preserved meat tissue still adhered to them.

In the May 9, 2008 issue of Science, a team reported that they identified nine species of seaweed and marine algae recovered from hearths and other areas in the ancient settlement. The seaweed samples were directly dated between 14,220 and 13,980 years ago.

However, Surovell et al. (2026) estimated a date of 11,000 years BP for the Lepué Tephra which is stratigraphically below the MV-II, indicating that it should be older than MV-II. The authors noted the erosional contact that represents missing time between layers contrary to Dillehay and colleagues, and they suggested that many Late Pleistocene wood and organic matter from the site are likely representing reworked material. Thus, they argued that the site cannot be dated to be older than the middle Holocene. This hypothesis has later been challenged by Dillehay.

==== Chinchihuapi I and Chinchihuapi II ====
These sites, located approximately 500 meters upstream from the Monte Verde sites along the same river, have been dated to about 14,500 BP. Similar materials, including burned areas and fragmentary scorched animal bones, along with small rock flakes, have been recovered. Dillehay and his team conducted excavations between the sites, using test pits and core drillings. They discovered 12 small burned features directly associated with both burned and unburned animal remains, manuport stones, and anthropologically modified flakes, which were dated between 18,500 BP and 14,500 BP. These findings likely indicate seasonal activities in the area. Up until 2019, Dillehay has conducted two additional excavations at the Chinchihuapi site, revealing the presence of lithic tools and flakes, as well as burned features associated with burned animal and plant remains in CH-I.

== Interpretations ==
Material evidence gathered at Monte Verde has reshaped the way archaeologists think about the earliest inhabitants of the Americas. Radiocarbon dating has provided a date of 14,000 BP and possibly 14,800-33,000 BP. Previously, the earliest accepted site had been determined to be near Clovis, New Mexico, dating between 13,500 and 13,000 BP, over 1,000 years later than Monte Verde.

The new dates supplied by Monte Verde have made the site a key factor in the debate over the first migration route from Asia to North America. Before the discovery of Monte Verde, the most popular and widely accepted theory was the overland route, which speculates that the first American inhabitants migrated from Asia across the Bering Strait and then spread throughout North America. However, the early dates associated with Monte Verde appear to weaken this theory. Prior to 13,000 BP, the Cordilleran Glacier (which covered much of present-day Canada) had not yet melted enough to reveal an ice-free corridor for people to reasonably journey by foot. The Monte Verde radiocarbon dates precede 13,000 BP, despite the fact that before the glacial melt, the vast, desolate, icy landscape of much of the Americas could not possibly have permitted enough vegetation to sustain traveling people or herded animals.

The most prevalent theory today is the coastal migration hypothesis, which argues that people migrated from Asia down along the western coasts of North and South America. Monte Verde is located 8,000 miles south of the Bering Strait. Such a considerable distance was probably unreasonable to trek by foot, especially on ice. Furthermore, remains of 22 varieties of seaweed are referenced in regards to this theory. Modern native inhabitants of the regions use these particular local seaweed varieties for medicinal purposes. Using an ethnographic analogy, this suggests that the Monte Verde residents used these varieties for similar purposes, which further suggests an extensive knowledge of marine resources. Together with a relative lack of stone tools, it appears that these first settlers were maritime-adapted hunter-gatherer-fishermen, and not necessarily big-game hunters like the Clovis. Therefore, it is feasible that they traveled along the coast by boat or along the shoreline, and could survive on marine resources throughout the voyage south.

The presence of non-local items at Monte Verde, such as plants, beach-rolled pebbles, quartz, and tar, indicates possible trade networks and other sites of human habitation of similar age.

== Academic history ==
=== Diffusion ===
Awareness about Monte Verde among the international archaeology community was greatly increased in 1989 when Dillehay delivered a presentation on Monte Verde at a conference on settlement of the Americas at the University of Maine. Archaeologist David J. Meltzer notes on that presentation:

The images Tom Dillehay was showing of the well-preserved remains at Monte Verde—wooden artifacts and house planks, fruits, berries, seeds, leaves, and stems, as well as marine algae, crayfish, chunks of animal hide, and what appeared to be several human coprolites found in three small pits—were unlike anything most of us, who long ago had learned to be used to stone tools and grateful for occasional bits of bone, had ever seen.

=== Pre-Clovis controversy ===
Because of the nature of the preservation of Monte Verde, it was one of the first Pre-Clovis sites to be accepted by the academic community. Dillehay, himself, doubted his dates due to the strong hold the Clovis First hypothesis had on the academic community. Monte Verde was one of the most accepted Pre-Clovis sites, according to a survey done by Amber Wheat in 2012. Out of 132 respondents (mainly archaeologists), approximately 65% of them confirmed Monte Verde as a Pre-Clovis site. Still, the early date for the site was not widely accepted until 1997. It had hitherto been generally agreed that ancient people had entered the Americas using the Bering Strait Land Bridge, which was about 13,000 kilometers (8,000 miles) north of the Monte Verde site. Though the Monte Verde site does not disprove the Bering Strait theory, it does support the theory that, instead of going down the ice free corridor as previously hypothesized, people may have populated the Americas through a coastal route. A group of 12 respected archaeologists revisited the site in 1997 and concluded that Monte Verde was an inhabited site and predated the Clovis culture. One of Dillehay's colleagues, Dr. Mario Pino, claimed a lower layer of the site is 33,200 years old, based on the discovery of burned wood several hundred feet to the south of Monte Verde. Radiocarbon dating established the wood as 33,000 years old. Dillehay was cautious of this earlier date, and as of 2007 it has not been verified or accepted by the scientific community.

=== Proposed Middle Holocene date ===
In 2026, a new study by researchers from the U.S. and Chile challenged the timeline of Monte Verde II occupation, suggesting the campsite was much younger than previously proposed and was not occupied until the Middle Holocene, after 8,200 years ago. This was the first independent analysis and dating of stratigraphy near the archaeological site (which was destroyed by flooding decades ago), as Dillehay and colleagues maintained exclusive permits. The new findings were immediately contested by Dillehay and some other experts, who criticised the extrapolation from stratigraphy distant from site itself, though some other scientists provided supportive comments regarding the paper.

In March 2026, the Fundación Monte Verde, of which Dillehay is the president, filed complaints with Chile's Consejo de Monumentos Nacionales (CMN). The complaint alleged irregularities in archaeological sampling activities conducted by archaeologist César Méndez, one of the coauthors of the study, and requested the invalidation of permits and retraction of associated publications in Science magazine. On April 8, 2026, the CMN voted unanimously to reject the complaints, finding that the archaeological activities complied with the approved permit and that most requests fell outside the CMN's legal competencies.

== Comparison to other early Americas sites ==
MV-I has been radiocarbon dated to 33,000 BP. As with other sites that suggest extremely early dates, such as the Topper site in South Carolina and Pedra Furada in Brazil, this deeper layer remains controversial.

The only other archaeological site in Southern Chile comparable in age to Monte Verde is Pilauco Bajo, dated to 12,500–11,000 BP. Researchers postulated that the two sites were complementary – Monte Verde would be a habitation site, and Pilauco Bajo would be a hunting and scavenging site. Further south lies the Pali Aike Crater lava tube, dated to 14,000–10,000 BP.

The Chinchorro culture, which was mostly a coastal culture of northern Chile and southern Peru, originated ca. 9,000 years BP, and was long lasting. Other sites on the coast, such as the Quebrada Jaguay, and Quebrada Tacahuay of Peru, seem to go back to ca. 13,000-12,000 BP. Huaca Prieta in northern Peru was occupied as early as 15,000 BP.

== See also ==
- Pre-Columbian trans-oceanic contact
- Archaeology of the Americas
- Prehispanic history of Chile
- Models of migration to the New World
- Meadowcroft Rockshelter
- Ñadi
- Lagoa Santa
- Paisley Caves - (coprolites and stone tools)
- White Sands footprints
