= Page–Ladson site =

Archaeological and paleontological site in Florida, US

Coordinates: 30.1702°N 83.9577°W

- Location within Florida
- Location: Jefferson and Taylor counties, Florida, United States

The Page–Ladson archaeological and paleontological site (8JE591) is a deep sinkhole in the bed of the karstic Aucilla River (between Jefferson and Taylor counties in the Big Bend region of Florida) that contains stratified deposits of late Pleistocene and early Holocene animal bones and human artifacts. The site was the first pre-Clovis site discovered in southeastern North America; radiocarbon evidence suggests that the site dates from 14,200 to 14,550 BP (12,250 to 12,600 BCE). These dates are roughly 1,000 to 1,500 years before the advent of the Clovis culture. Early dates for Page–Ladson challenge theories that humans quickly decimated large game populations in the area once they arrived.

== Prehistoric environment ==
At the height of the last ice age (the Wisconsin glaciation), the sea level was up to 100 meters lower than at present. Much more land was above the water along the coast, which was extended much farther to the west. Most of Florida is a thick limestone platform, with typical Karst topography. As limestone is porous, salt water penetrates the lower part of the Florida platform, and fresh water floats on top of the salt water. With the lowered sea level of the ice age, the fresh water table in Florida also was lowered, leaving most of Florida much drier than it is at present. The only reliable sources of fresh water at elevations that are currently above sea level were sinkholes and the deeper parts of river beds. The Page–Ladson site was one of those watering holes, located in a ravine that is now the bed of the river. Before it was inundated by the Aucilla river, Page–Ladson was a sinkhole containing a small pond within it. Currently, Page–Ladson is about 60 m by 45 m wide and 10 m deep.

The lower part of the Aucilla River (from the Cody Scarp to the Gulf of Mexico) crosses the Woodville Karst Plain, which consists of a thin layer of sand over limestone bedrock. Much of the flow of the Aucilla River has been captured by an underground drainage system created by karst processes. Sections of the river are entirely underground, surfacing for short stretches and then disappearing again. The Page–Ladson site is located in one of the above ground sections, known as Half-Mile Run (although it is closer to one mile long). Other sites on the Aucilla River also are yielding paleontological and archaeological finds, first as part of the long-running Aucilla River Prehistory Project, and, more recently, by the Aucilla Research Institute (https://www.aucillaresearchinstitute.org/), the Center for the Study of the First Americans (https://liberalarts.tamu.edu/csfa/research/#page), and Florida State University (https://sites.google.com/view/jessi-j-halligan/research-projects).

== Aucilla River Prehistory Project ==
Starting in 1959, Dick Ohmes and other scuba divers began retrieving artifacts and Pleistocene animal bones bearing butcher marks from the lower reaches of the Aucilla River. A team led by archaeologist James S. Dunbar and paleontologist S. David Webb began a survey of Half-Mile Run in 1983. A former U.S. Navy Seal, Buddy Page, showed them a site where he had found elephant bones. A 20-inch-deep (510 mm) test pit yielded elephant bones, bone tools, and chips from tool making. Radiocarbon dating of organic material from the pit yielded dates from 13,000 to 11,700 years Before Present. The owners of the land surrounding Half-Mile Run, the Ladson family, granted permission to the team to access and camp along Half-Mile Run. Therefore, the site was named Page–Ladson.

From 1983 until 1997, Dunbar (then with the Florida Bureau of Archaeological Research) and Webb (then with the Florida Museum of Natural History at University of Florida) led excavations, collectively termed the Aucilla River Prehistory Project (ARPP). Florida Museum of Natural History published an annual Aucilla River Times newsletter, as well as researchers reporting in scientific periodicals.

As the project progressed, the team developed new methods of recording the stratigraphic placement of all material in an underwater environment. This excavation yielded eight lithic artifacts associated with mastodon butchering. This excavation dated the artifacts to approximately 14,400 BP, confirming that the Page–Ladson site was a Pre-Clovis site and the oldest site east of the Mississippi River.

In 2012, archaeological excavation at Page–Ladson resumed, following Dunbar's discovery of the pre-Clovis component at the site, with the intention of finding the oldest dates for human remains and artifacts at the site. These excavations continued until 2014. This excavation yielded six lithic artifacts (bifaces and flakes) made from local coastal plain chert from layers dating before Clovis. This excavation dated the site to approximately 14,200 to 14,550 BP, reaffirming the earlier dating from the previous excavation. The 2012-2014 excavation was funded by the Center for the Study of First Americans and private grants; led by Jessi Halligan, James Dunbar, and Michael Waters; and included local support such as from Dunbar's Aucilla Research Institute and researchers from additional institutions such as Indiana University of Pennsylvania.

== Late Pleistocene animals and Paleoindians ==
The lowest stratum in Page–Ladson dates to the late Pleistocene. It includes mastodon, mammoth, horse, ground sloth, palaeolama bones, and "straw mats" of chopped vegetation (leaves, bark, and wood) of relatively uniform length. The length of the chopped vegetation is consistent with the spacing between cusps on mastodon teeth, and the "straw mats" have been interpreted as equivalent to the layers of trampled elephant dung found around water holes in Africa. Elephant steroids have been identified in the "digesta" deposits at Page–Ladson and Latvis–Simpson (a 32,000-year-old mastodon site farther south in the Aucilla). Some of the bones from this level show apparently human-made cut marks, particularly a complete mastodon tusk. Ivory spear points (often called "foreshafts") are found more frequently in the Aucilla River than from any other sites in North America. Samples from the "straw mat" level have yielded radiocarbon dates from 13,130 +/- 200 to 11,770 +/- 90 years Before Present. The "straw mat" level is covered by a layer of mud that did not contain any bones of extinct animals.

== People of the early Archaic period ==
In 1996, an Early Archaic Bolen habitation level was found. At least three hearths were identified along with various stone points, scrapers, adzes, and gouges that were found, as well as antler points used to press flakes off the stone tools. Three wooden stakes were found upright in the ground, and a cypress log that had been burned on the top side and hollowed out. Radiocarbon dating yielded dates approximately 10,000 years Before Present. The site was well preserved because it had been flooded by a rise in the river level within a hundred years after the site had been occupied.

== Evidence of Floridian human and mastodon coexistence ==
Underwater archaeologists and other researchers reexamining the Page–Ladson site have shown that some Late Pleistocene human populations provisioned themselves with mastodons that were either butchered or scavenged 14,450 years ago (~14,550 cal yr B.P.), about 2,000 years before large mammal extinction. Prior to this determination, evidence of human scavenging or butchering of mastodons was deemed ambiguous.

"The new discoveries at Page–Ladson show that people were living in the Gulf Coast area much earlier than believed, The stone tools and faunal remains at the site show that at 14,550 years ago, people knew how to find game, fresh water and material for making tools. These people were well-adapted to this environment. The site is a slam-dunk pre-Clovis site with unequivocal artifacts, clear stratigraphy and thorough dating" (Phys.org).

== See also ==
- List of fossil sites (with link directory)
- Little Salt Spring
