= Atlantic Salvor =

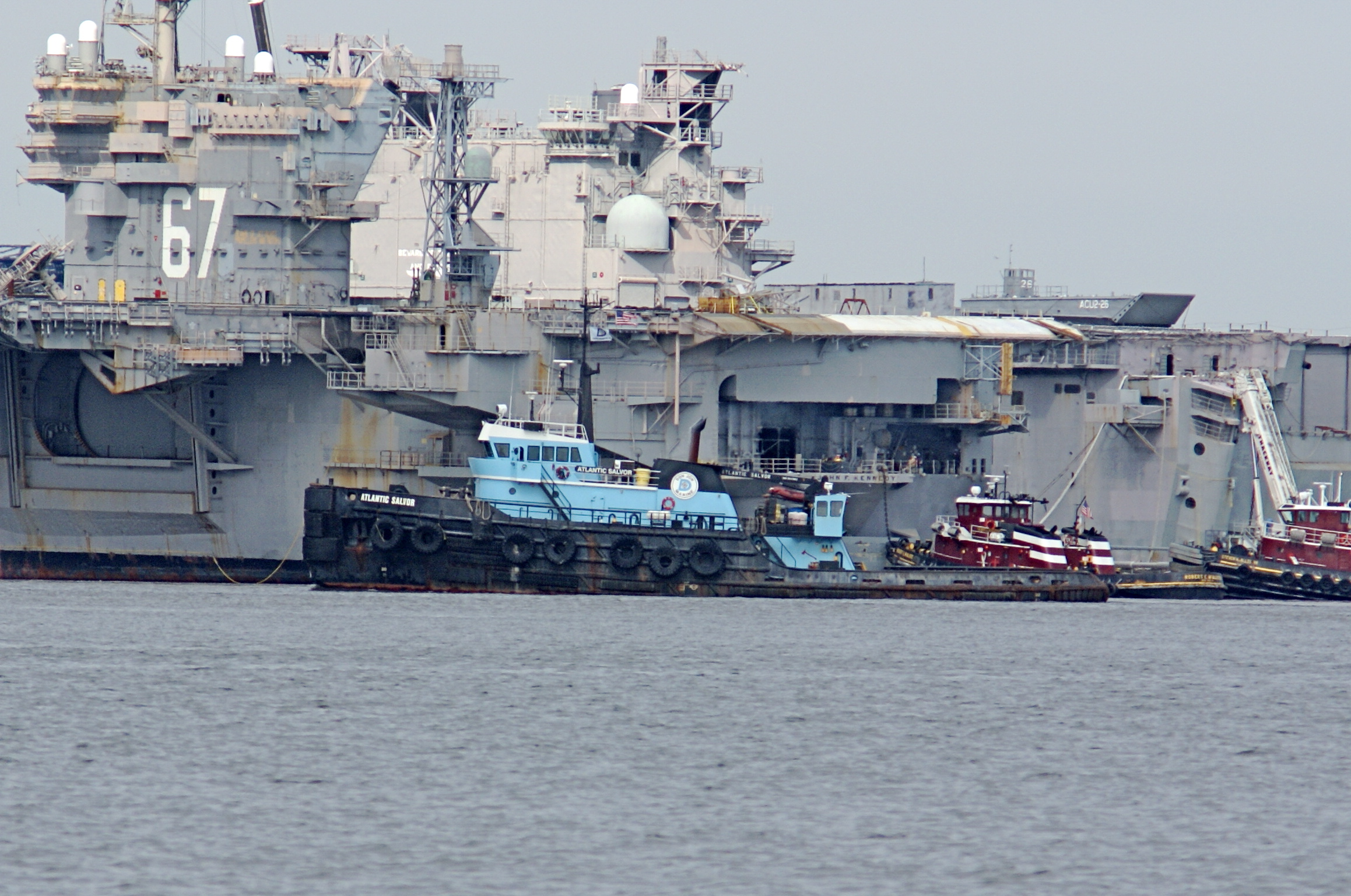
- Atlantic Salvor (center) stands by as ex-USS John F. Kennedy (CV-67) is docked in Philadelphia.

History
- Name: Mister Darby (1977–1998); Atlantic Salvor (1998–)
- Builder: Halter Marine Inc.
- Yard number: 496
- Launched: 1 Feb 1977
- Identification: IMO number: 7719624; Callsign: WCX9569; MMSI no.: 366744010
- Status: In service as of 2023

General characteristics
- Tonnage: 852 GT 255 NT
- Length: 42.8762 m (140.670 ft) LOA
- Beam: 12.192 m (40.00 ft) molded breadth
- Depth: 6.7574 m (22.170 ft) molded depth
- Installed power: 2 × 150 kW (200 hp) aux. generators
- Propulsion: 2 × ALCO 16-251F 16 cylinder engines; 2,312.6 kW (3,101.2 hp) maximum continuous each
- Capacity: 896 cu m of fuel capacity
- Notes: Two cast steel propellers

Starboard Profile Atlantic Salvor

Atlantic Salvor is a US-flagged ocean-going tugboat owned and operated by Donjon Marine of Hillside, New Jersey. Sailing under her original name Mister Darby until 1998, the boat was built by Halter Marine Inc. and launched on 1 February 1977. She was involved in the salvage operation following the wreck of New Carissa.

== Construction ==
Then named Mister Darby, the boat's construction was completed and she was delivered to Jackson Marine Corporation on 9 February 1997. Her hull, constructed from ordinary strength steel, has an overall length of 42.9 metres (141 ft), a molded breadth of 6.8 metres (22 ft), and a moulded depth of 6.8 metres (22 ft). The boat has a total of 21 tanks: 12 for fuel oil, 5 for ballast water, 5 for lubricating oil, 7 apiece for fresh- and waste-water, a hydraulic oil tank, a slop tank, and an anchor chain locker. The tug can carry up to 6 cubic meters of fuel, has a gross tonnage of 852 GT and a net tonnage of 205 NT.

The boat's propulsion is powered by two Alco Engine Inc. 16-251F engines with a maximum continuous power rating of 2,312.6 kilowatts (3,101.2 hp) apiece. Each engine has 17 228.6-millimetre (9.00 in) cylinders with a piston stroke of 266.7-millimetre (10.50 in). Each engine powers a single cast steel propeller. Electrical power is generated by two Detroit Diesel 8V71 150-kilowatt (200 hp) auxiliary generators. The bow thruster is powered by a single Detroit Diesel 8V71. It also has one Detroit Diesel 12V71 fire pump engine along with a single Detroit Diesel 8V71 tow winch engine.

In 1998, the tugboat was purchased by Donjon and renamed Atlantic Salvor.

== History ==
=== Salvage of the New Carissa ===
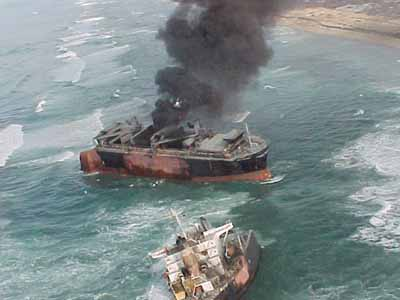
New Carissa, after breaking into two sections.

MV New Carissa was a Japanese-owned bulk carrier flying the Panamanian flag of convenience that ran aground on a beach near Coos Bay, Oregon, United States, during a storm in February 1999, and subsequently broke apart. The ship's insurers declared the vessel to be a total loss. As a result, New Carissa was no longer a salvageable vessel; instead, she had effectively become a shipwreck.

Attempts using the "Salvage Chief" and the "Atlantic Salvor" pulling together to refloat and tow the stern section were unsuccessful.

=== Tow of the ex-USS John F. Kennedy ===
Atlantic Salvor was hired by the United States Navy to tow the decommissioned ex-John F. Kennedy from Norfolk to Philadelphia in March 2008.
