= Kolkata-class destroyer =

Class of guided-missile destroyers

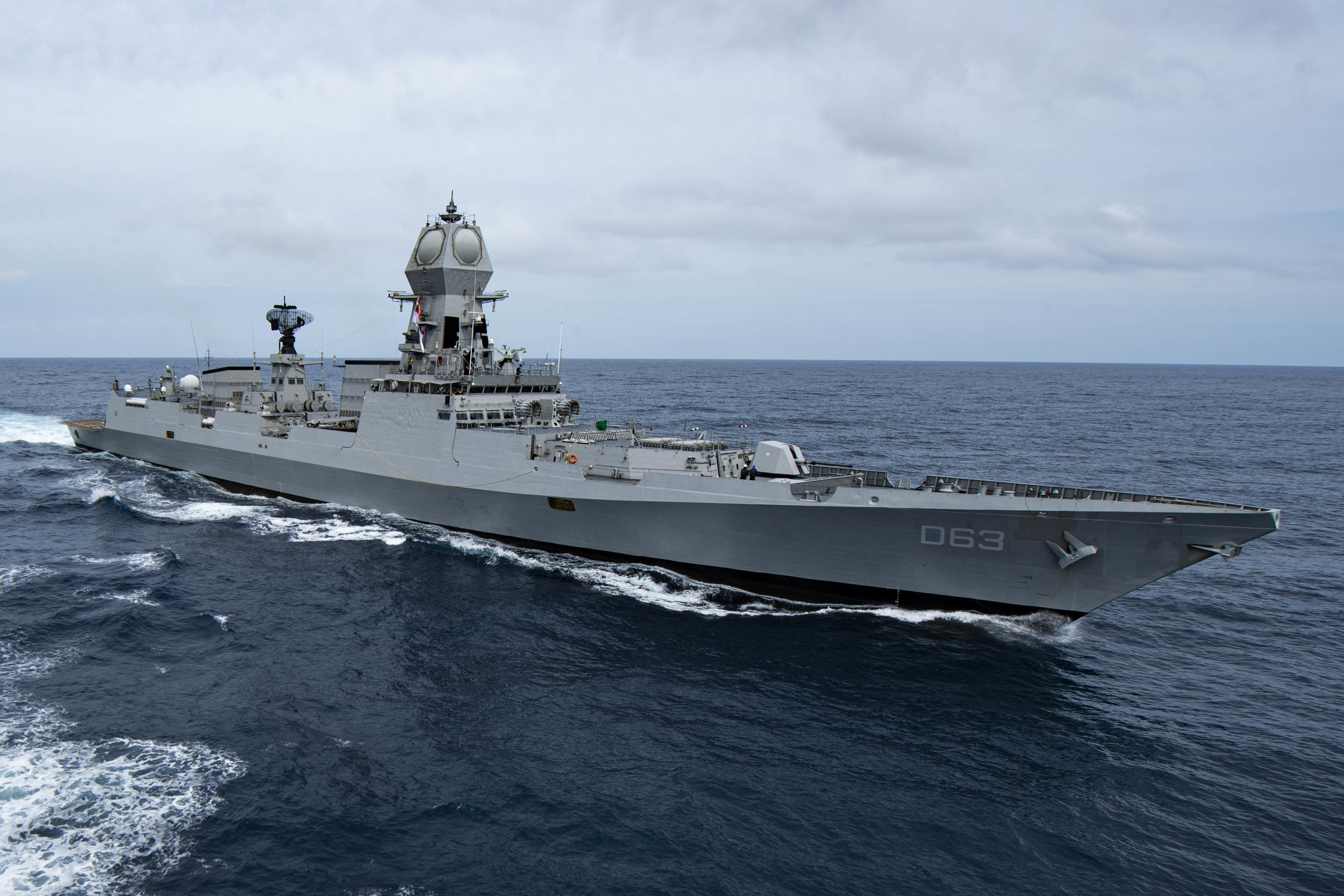
- INS Kolkata at exercise Malabar, 2020.

Class overview
- Name: Kolkata class
- Builders: Mazagon Dock Limited
- Operators: Indian Navy
- Preceded by: Delhi class
- Succeeded by: Visakhapatnam class
- Cost: ₹11,662 crore (equivalent to ₹190 billion or US$1.9 billion in 2023) for three ships (FY 2014); ₹3,887 crore (equivalent to ₹62 billion or US$640 million in 2023) per ship (FY 2014)
- Built: 2003–2015
- In commission: 2014–present
- Planned: 3
- Completed: 3
- Active: 3

General characteristics
- Type: Guided-missile destroyer
- Displacement: 7,400 t (7,300 long tons; 8,200 short tons) full load
- Length: 163 m (534 ft 9 in)
- Beam: 17.4 m (57 ft 1 in)
- Draught: 6.5 m (21 ft 4 in)
- Propulsion: Combined gas and gas system: 4 × Zorya-Mashproekt DT-59 reversible gas turbines producing 16.55MW each
- Speed: 30 knots (56 km/h)
- Range: 6,000 nmi (11,000 km) at 18 kn (33 km/h)
- Complement: 300 (50 officers + 250 sailors)
- Sensors & processing systems: Radar :-; IAI EL/M-2248 MF-STAR S-band AESA multi-function radar; Thales LW-08 D-band air search radar; Indra - TASL Lanza-N L-band air surveillance radar (INS Kolkata); Garpun Bal (3TS-25E) radar; Sonar :-; BEL HUMSA-NG bow sonar; BEL Nagin active towed array sonar; Combat Suite :-; BEL EMCCA Mk4 combat management system
- Electronic warfare & decoys: BEL Ellora electronic support measures; Decoys :-; 4 × Kavach decoy launchers; 2 × Maareech torpedo-countermeasure systems
- Armament: Anti-air warfare :-; 4 × 8-cell VLS, for a total of 32 Barak 8 surface-to-air missiles; Anti-surface warfare :-; 2 × 8-cell VLS, for 16 BrahMos anti-ship missiles; Anti-submarine warfare :-; 4 × 533 mm (21 in) torpedo tubes; 2 × RBU-6000 anti-submarine rocket launchers; Guns :-; 1 × OTO Melara 76 mm naval gun; 4 x AK-630 CIWS
- Aircraft carried: 2 × Westland Sea King, Sikorsky SH-60 Seahawk or HAL Dhruv helicopters
- Aviation facilities: Dual Enclosed hangar

The Kolkata-class destroyers, also known Project 15A or Project 15 Alpha, is a class of three VLS-equipped stealth guided-missile destroyers constructed for the Indian Navy. The class comprises three ships – Kolkata, Kochi and Chennai, all of which were built by Mazagon Dock Limited (MDL) in India, and are the largest destroyers to be operated by the Indian Navy. Due to delays in construction and sea trials, the initial commissioning date of the first ship of the class was pushed back from 2010 to 2014.

The destroyers are a follow-on of the Project 15 Delhi-class destroyers, but are considerably more capable due to major improvements in the design, the addition of substantial land-attack capabilities, the fitting-out of modern sensors and weapons systems, and the expanded use of net-centric capability such as Cooperative Engagement Capability.

== Design ==
The Kolkata class share similar dimensions to the previous Delhi class, however they have 2,363 modifications which include major upgrades in weaponry, sensors and helicopter systems. With a standard displacement of 6,800 t (6,700 long tons; 7,500 short tons) and a full-load displacement of 7,400 t (7,300 long tons; 8,200 short tons), they are the largest destroyers ever operated by the Indian Navy. Some media reports have even given a full-load displacement of 7,500 t (7,400 long tons; 8,300 short tons). These are the first stealth destroyers built by India and marked a significant development in India's shipbuilding technology. The ships incorporate modern weapons and sensors, and have an advanced information warfare suite, an auxiliary control system with a sophisticated power distribution architecture, and modular crew quarters.

The class have a length of 163 m (534 ft 9 in), a beam of 17.4 m (57 ft 1 in) and a draught of 6.5 m (21 ft 4 in). The ship's power and propulsion features a combined gas and gas system utilizing four DT-59 reversible gas turbines. This configuration allows the ship to reach speeds in excess of 30 knots (56 km/h; 35 mph). Aviation facilities include a large flight deck, which was re-designed to handle larger helicopters than the Delhi class, and an enclosed hangar for up to two maritime helicopters.

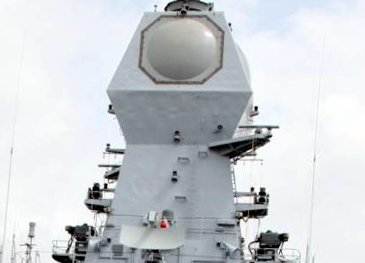
The EL/M-2248 MF-STAR AESA is the primary radar of the Kolkata class

The primary radar sensor of the class is the EL/M-2248 MF-STAR multi-mission AESA. It is also equipped with Thales LW-08 long range volume search radar. Thales LW-08 will later be replaced by Indra - TASL Lanza-N L-band air surveillance radar.

The ship's main air-defence armament is composed of four eight-cell vertical launching systems (VLS) allowing for up to thirty-two Barak 8 / MRSAM air defence missiles.

The class is designed for network-centric warfare such as Cooperative Engagement Capability, where they operate wide-area air defense, distributing assets and control over different platforms and locations, and harnessing multiple sensors & effectors into a single air defense system. In May 2019, 2 ships of the class conducted the maiden cooperative engagement firing of the Barak 8 / MRSAM by using the Joint Taskforce Coordination (JTC) mode to intercept several simultaneous aerial targets involving two complex scenarios at extended ranges. With it, the Indian Navy became the second naval service in the world after the United States, and the first in Asia to have developed and deployed it. The capability is to be rolled out on all future major warships of the Indian Navy.

Four AK-630 CIWSs are fitted for close-in defence.

The supersonic BrahMos anti-ship and land-attack missiles are the primary offensive armament of the Kolkata class. The BrahMos missiles are fitted into a 16-cell Universal Vertical Launcher Module (UVLM) allowing one missile per launch silo, and all 16 missiles can be fired in salvo.

The class carries a 76 mm (3 in) naval gun located forward of the bridge, which provides limited anti-shipping capability and anti-air capability in addition to its naval gun fire-support role for land-based operations.

A bow-mounted sonar HUMSA-NG (hull-mounted sonar array – new generation) is carried for sub-surface surveillance.

For anti-submarine warfare, the Kolkata class are equipped with a torpedo launching system via four torpedo tubes and two RBU-6000 anti-submarine rocket launchers.

BEL's Electronic Modular Command & Control Applications (EMCCA) Mk4 provides combat management.

Forty lakh (four million) lines of codes have been written to develop the advanced combat management system onboard INS Kochi. The system is designed so that all the data about the surrounding threat comes in one place, along with analysis of the kind of threat. The system also advises the commanding officer about the kind of weaponry he should use to tackle the threat in real time. The ship is equipped with sophisticated digital networks, such as Asynchronous Transfer Mode based Integrated Ship Data Network (AISDN), Combat Management System (CMS), Automatic Power Management System (APMS) and Auxiliary Control System (ACS). The AISDN is the information highway on which data from all the sensors and weapon ride. The CMS is used to integrate information from other platforms using an indigenous data-link system to provide Maritime Domain Awareness. The intricate power supply management is done using APMS, and remote control and monitoring of machinery is achieved through the ACS.

== Development ==
In 1986, the Cabinet Committee on Political Affairs (CCPA) approved a follow-on class of the earlier Project 15 Delhi-class destroyers. The aim was that the follow-on class would incorporate a higher level of air-defence, land attack, anti-submarine, and anti-ship capabilities than the preceding class. However, the Indian Navy did not initially take up the option. By the year 2000, the Indian Navy had redesigned the follow-on Kolkata class to incorporate even higher levels of technology (including modern stealth characteristics) and in May of that year, approval for the construction was given. The concept and function for Project 15A was framed by the navy's Directorate of Naval Design, while the detailed design was developed by Mazagon Dock Limited (MDL).

Initially in 2008, the total program cost with long-term spare parts was expected to cost ₹3,800 crore (US$390 million), but the construction costs escalated about 225%, and by 2011, cost of the program became ₹11,662 crore (US$1.2 billion), with each ship costing ₹3,900 crore (US$400 million). The Defense Minister A. K. Antony cited the causes being the delay in supply of warship-grade steel by Russia, increase in costs of Russian specialists due to inflation during the build period, wage revision due from October 2003 and delay in finalisation of cost of weapons and sensors. A Comptroller and Auditor General of India report published in 2010 blamed the Navy for delays, criticising the late decisions for replacement of surface to air missile system with Barak, change of gun mount, inclusion of a sonar dome and modification of helicopter hangar to accommodate HAL Dhruv.

=== Construction ===
Construction of three Kolkata-class ships was sanctioned by the Government of India in May 2000, and steel for the lead ship was cut in March 2003. Construction began in September 2003 at Mazagon Docks, Mumbai, with an initial expectation that the first of the class would be handed over to the navy by 2010. However, since then the Kolkata class has suffered consecutive delays, slow construction procedures, and technical problems, which saw the first ship of the class enter service during mid-2014. The delays in the construction programme have been attributed to persistent design changes made by the Indian Navy to incorporate new weapons systems and sensors, failure by a Ukrainian shipyard to deliver the ship's propellers and shafts, and the contract later being awarded to a Russian firm, and finally the delay in the delivery of the Barak 8 anti-air missiles.

The Kolkata class are the largest destroyers ever to be constructed at Mazagon Docks. Technical problems were found during the sea trials of the lead ship Kolkata, which delayed the project by six months to early 2014.

== Ships of the class ==
Name	Pennant	Yard No.	Builder	Laid Down	Launched	Commissioned	Status
Kolkata	D63	701	Mazagon Dock Limited	26 September 2003	30 March 2006	16 August 2014	Active
Kochi	D64	702	Mazagon Dock Limited	25 October 2005	18 September 2009	30 September 2015	Active
Chennai	D65	703	Mazagon Dock Limited	21 February 2006	1 April 2010	21 November 2016	Active

== Gallery ==
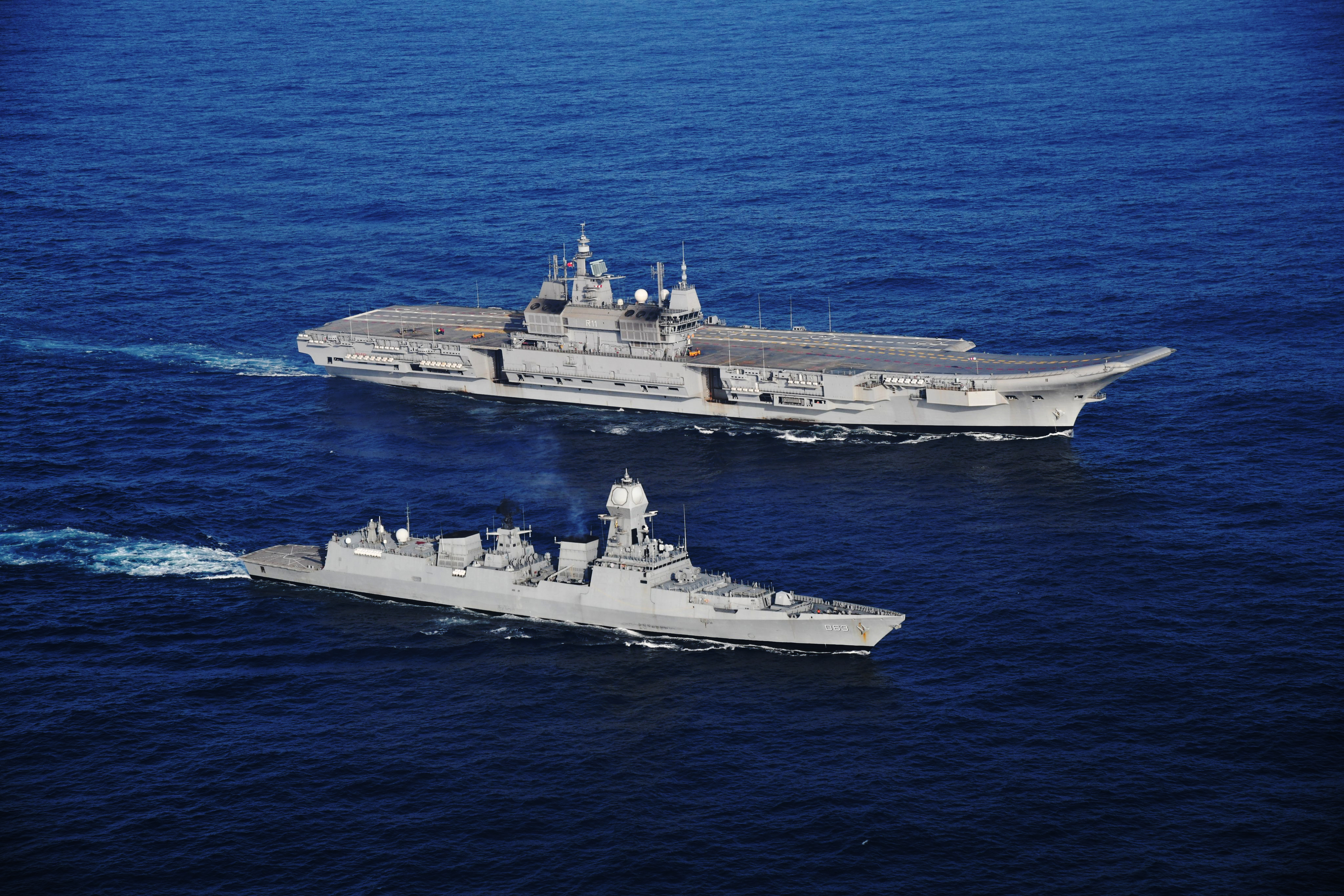
Kolkata with Vikrant (R11) during sea trial

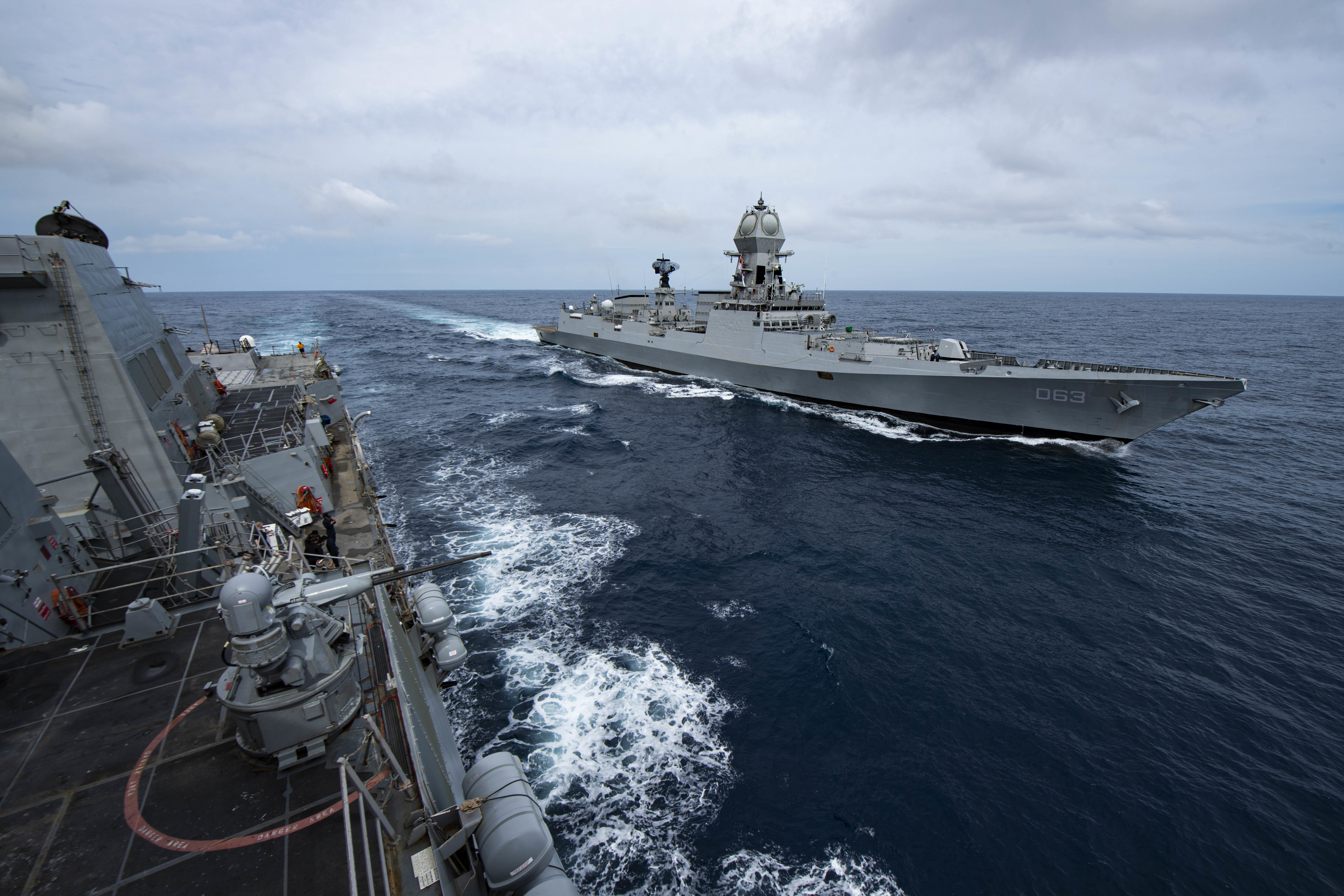
Kolkata alongside USS Sterett during Exercise Malabar 2020.

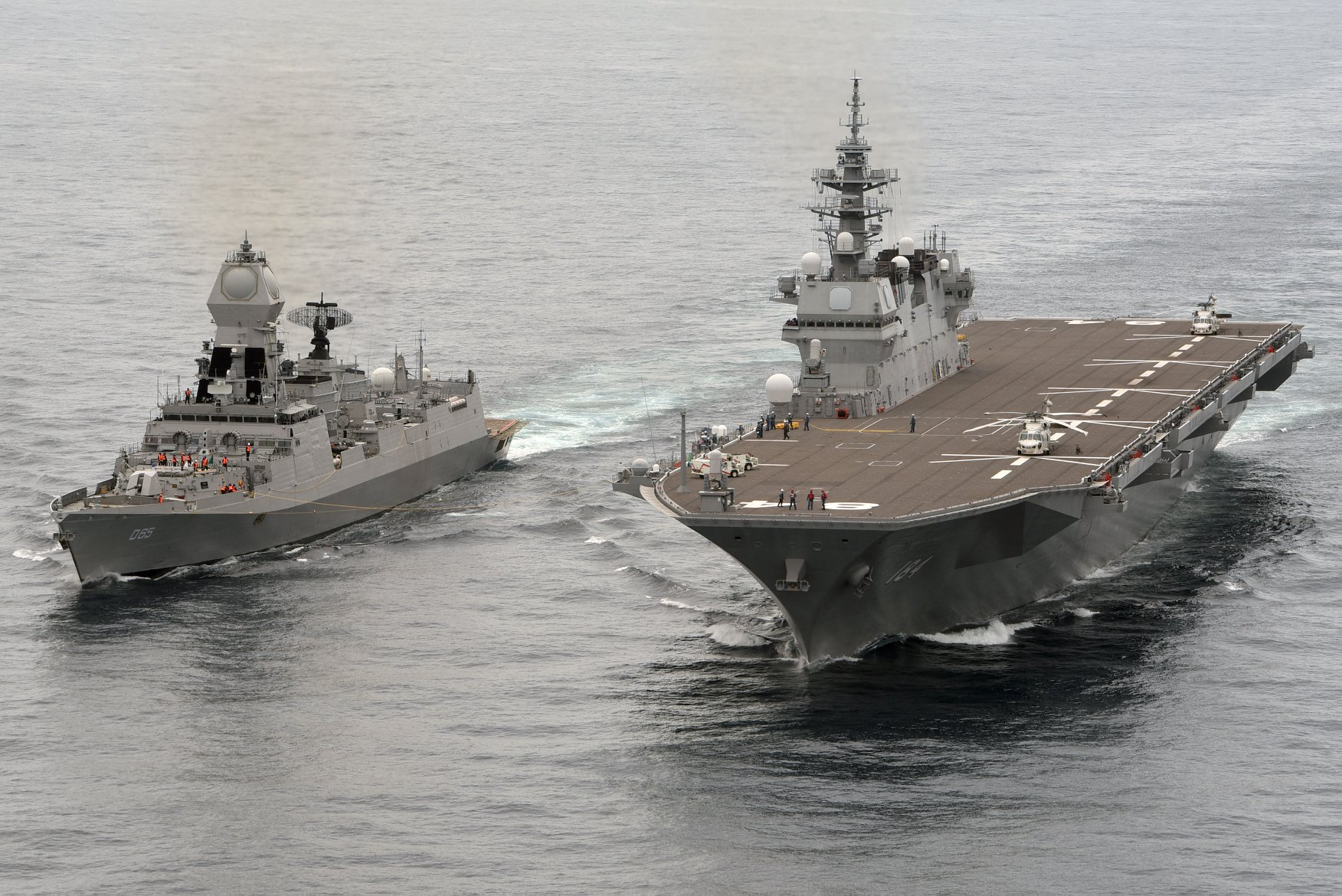
Chennai with JS Kaga during JIMEX 2020.

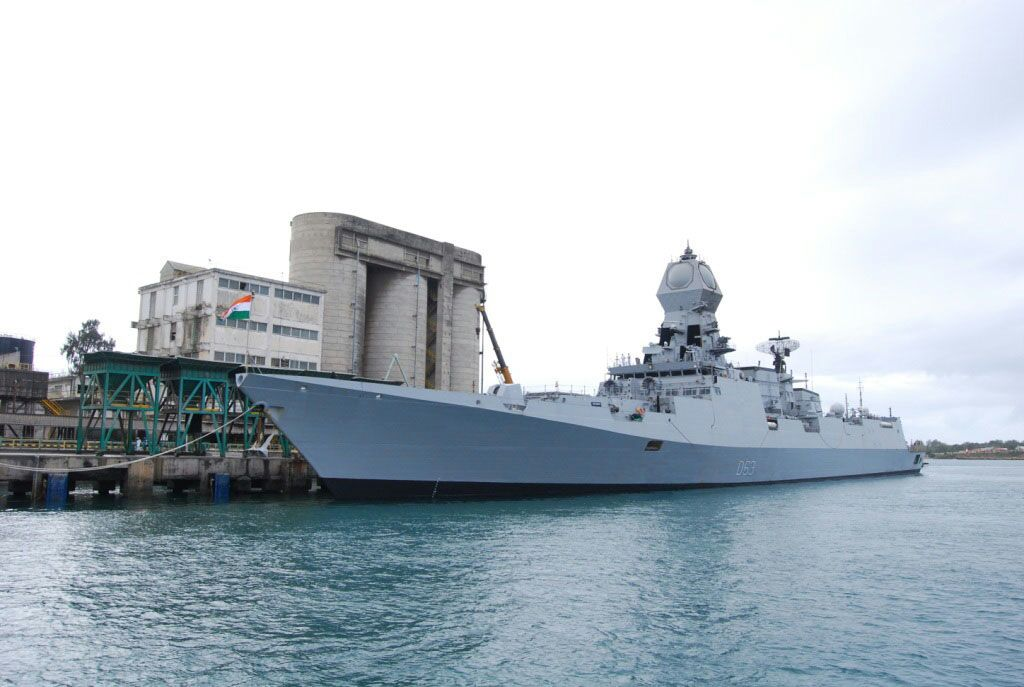
INS Kolkata at Mombasa, Kenya.

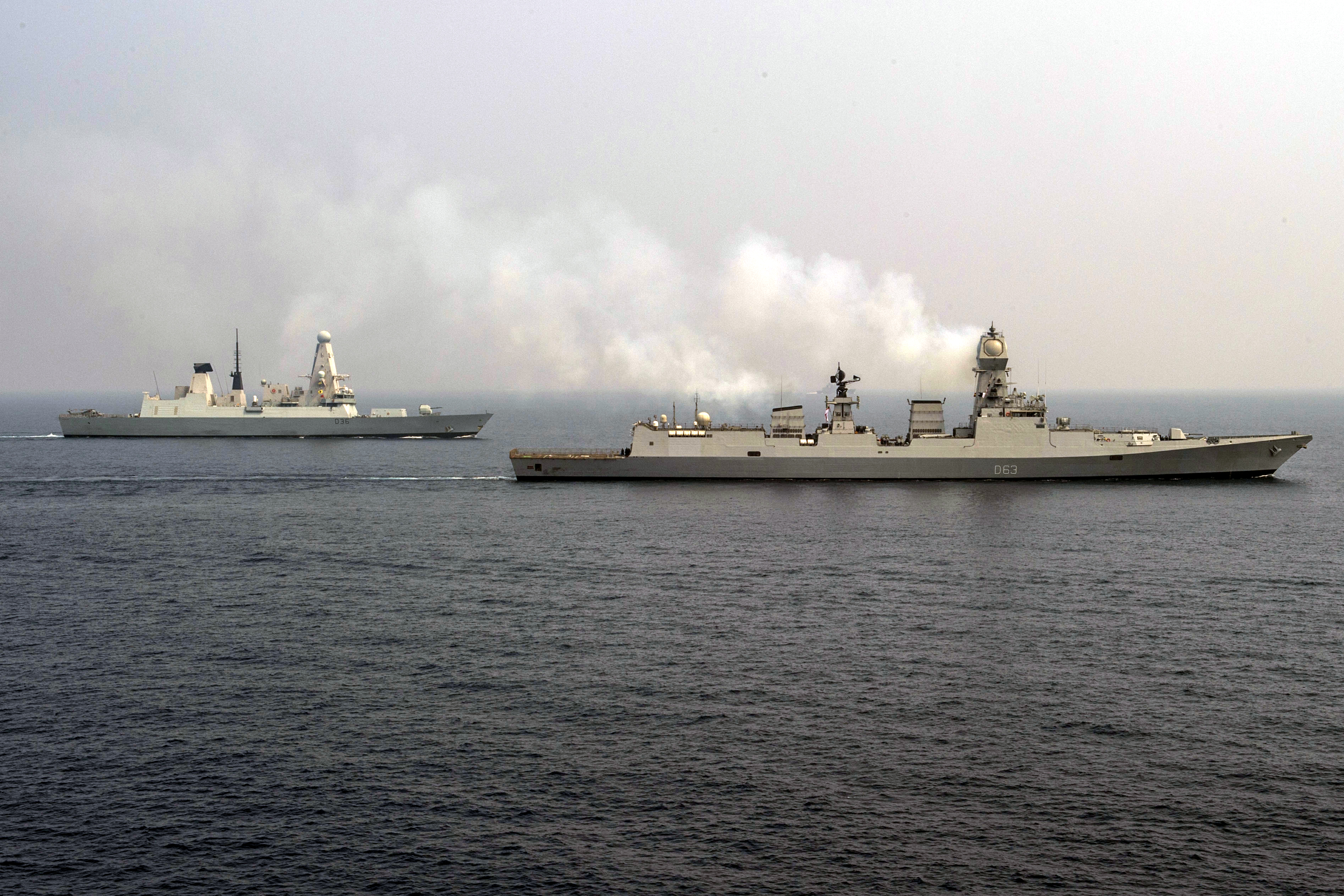
INS Kolkata and HMS Defender during an exercise.

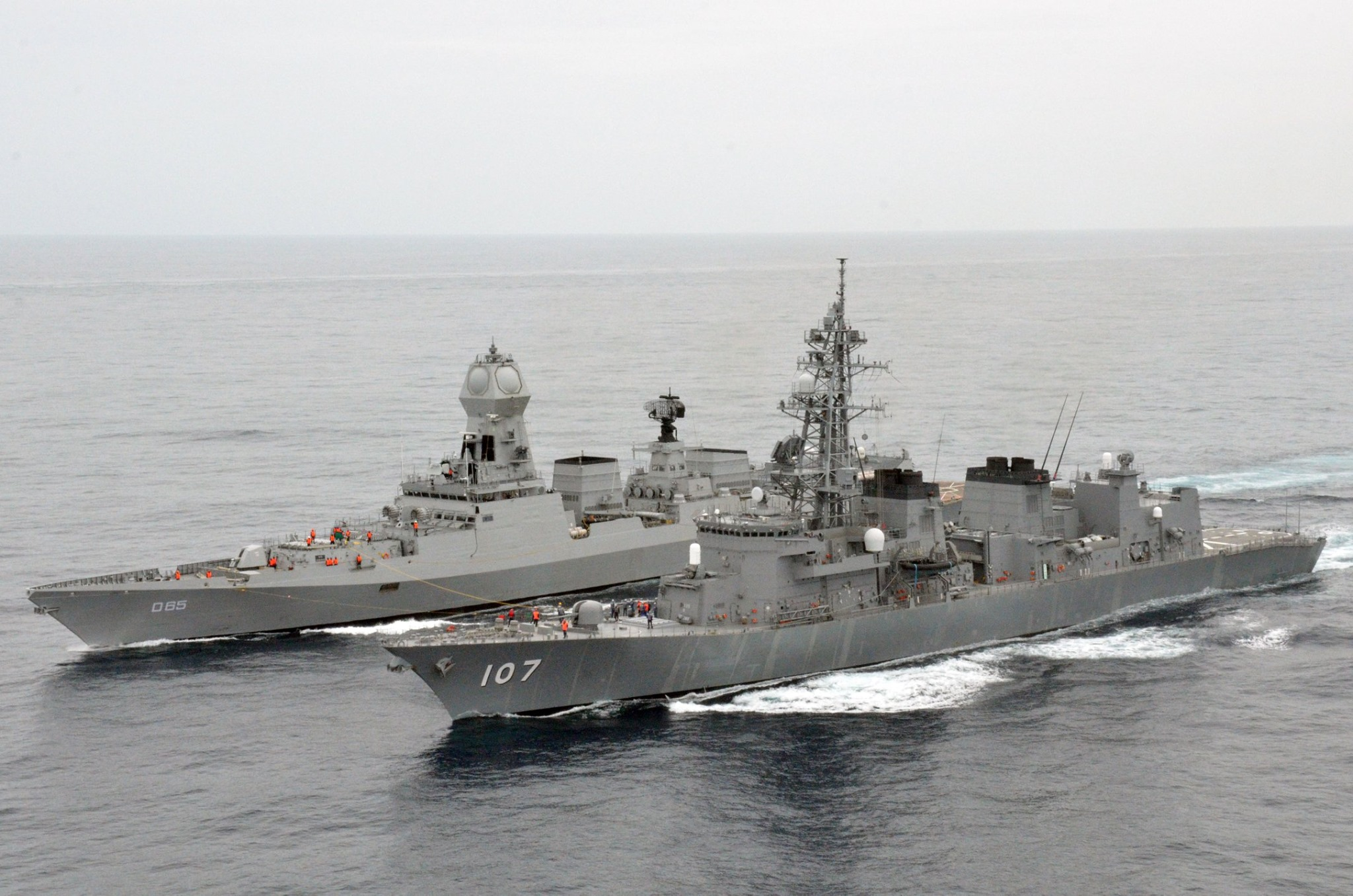
INS Chennai with JS Ikazuchi.

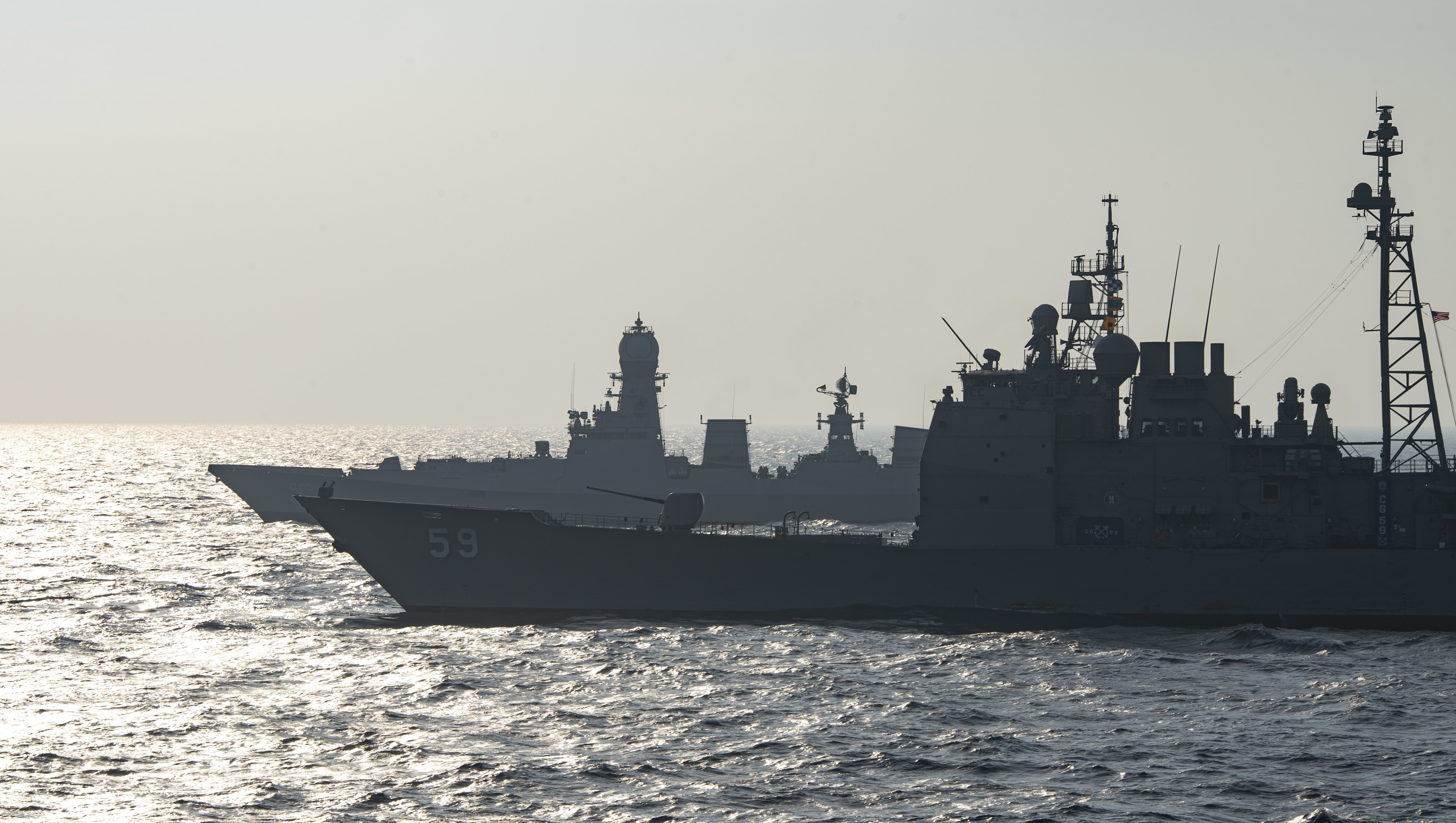
INS Chennai during Malabar 2020.

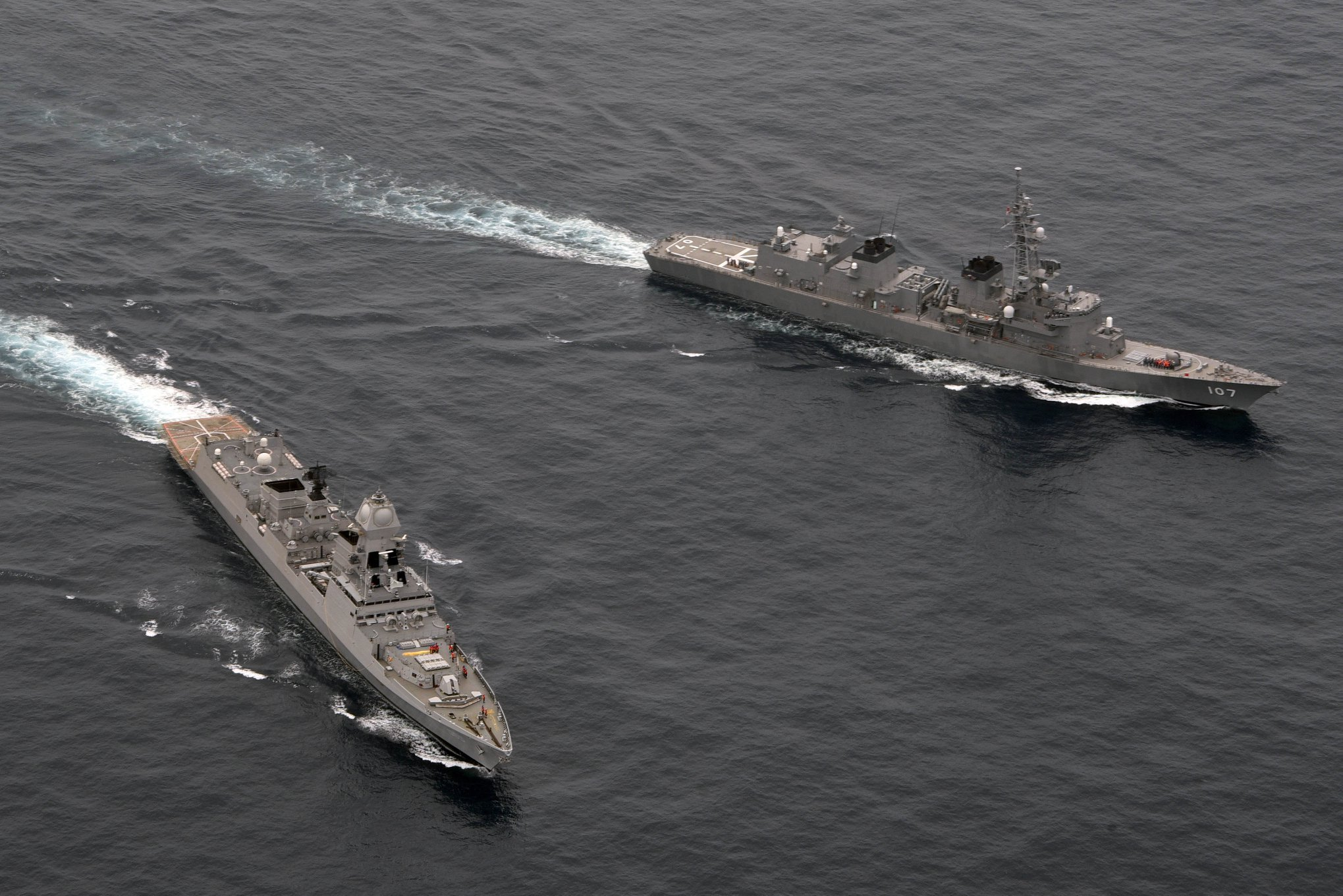
INS Chennai and JS Ikazuchi during JIMEX 2020.

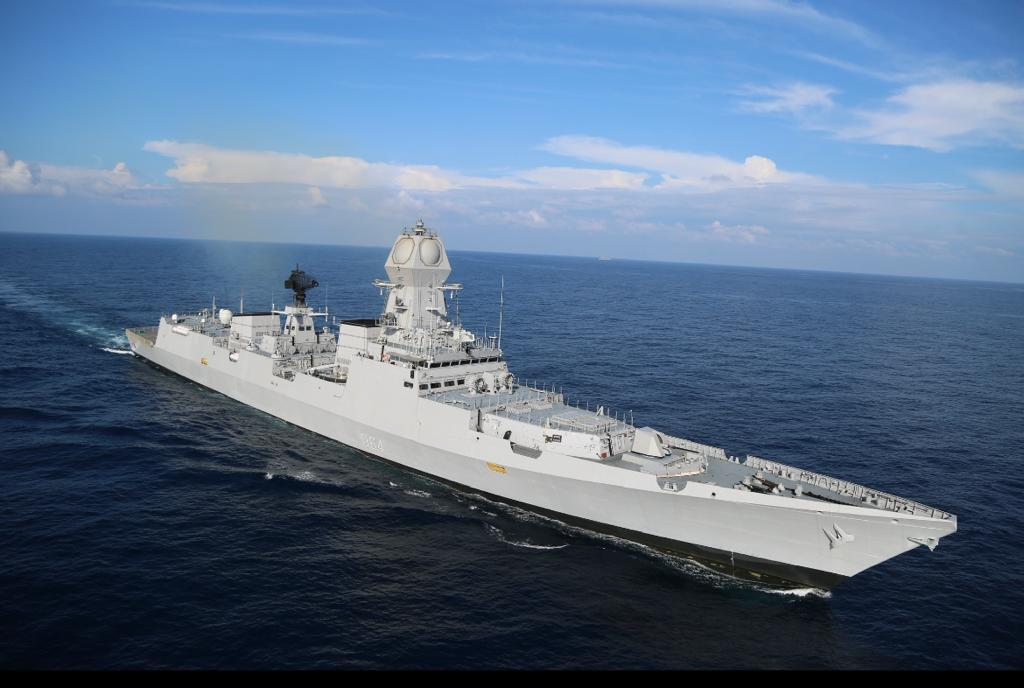
INS Kochi.

== See also ==
- List of destroyer classes in service
- Future of the Indian Navy

Equivalent destroyers of the same era

- Type 052D
- Atago class
- Type 45
- Sejong the Great class (Batch I)
