= Littlejohn =

Littlejohn may refer to:

== People ==
- Adrian Littlejohn (born 1970), British footballer
- Agnes Littlejohn (1865–1944), Australian writer
- Alan Littlejohn (1929–1996), British musician
- Charles Littlejohn (rower) (1889–1960), New Zealand rower
- Charles Littlejohn (born 1985), American IRS data leaker
- Charles Philip Littlejohn (1923–2014), Clerk of the New Zealand House of Representatives
- De Witt Clinton Littlejohn (1818–1892), American politician and Union Army brigadier general
- Hawk Littlejohn, (1941–2000), American flute maker whose given name was Larry Snyder
- Henry Littlejohn (1826–1914), surgeon and instigator of Public Health concepts in UK
- Jack Littlejohn (born 1991), Australian Rugby League player
- Jimmy Littlejohn (1910–1989), British sportsman
- John Littlejohn (1931–1994), American electric blues slide guitarist
- John Littlejohn (preacher) (1756–1836), American preacher and sheriff
- Kenneth Littlejohn (born c. 1941), British armed robber and self-proclaimed double agent
- Raymond Littlejohns (1893–1961), Australian ornithologist and accountant
- Richard Littlejohn (born 1954), British journalist
- Stephen W. Littlejohn (1944–2024), American communication scholar
- William Still Littlejohn (1859–1933), Scottish headmaster in New Zealand and Australia

=== Fictional characters ===
- William Harper Littlejohn, a fictional character in the Doc Savage universe
- Bel Littlejohn, a character created by British satirist Craig Brown
- Littlejohn, a novel by Howard Owen.

== Other uses ==
- Littlejohn's tree frog, a species frog in Australia
- Littlejohn adaptor, a military tank weapon accessory
- Littlejohn Vase, a British sports trophy
- Littlejohn Coliseum, an arena in Clemson, South Carolina, U.S.
- Littlejohn Island, Maine, U.S.

== See also ==
- Litteljohn
- Little John (disambiguation)
