= Big John =

Big John may refer to:

== People ==
=== In sports ===
- John Baker (defensive lineman, born 1935) (1935-2007), American National Football League player
- John Cannady (1923–2002), American National Football League player
- John Huard (1944-2025), American former National Football League and Canadian Football League player and coach, member of the College Football Hall of Fame
- John Kissell (1923-1992), American National Football League and All-America Football Conference player
- John Macklin (c. 1884–1949), American college football player, multi-sport head coach and athletics administrator
- Big John Mazmanian (1926–2006), American drag racer
- John McCarthy (referee) (born 1962), former referee for the Ultimate Fighting Championship (UFC)
- John Merritt (1926–1983), American football coach
- John R. Richards (1875–1947), American college football player, coach, educator and public administrator
- John Sears (racing driver) (1931-1999), American NASCAR driver
- Big John Studd (1948–1995), professional wrestler
- John Tate (boxer) (1955–1998), American boxer, WBA heavyweight champion (1979-1980)
- John Thompson (basketball) (1941–2020), American two-time NBA championship-winning player and NCAA championship-winning coach
- Jerry Tuite (1966–2003), American former pro wrestler

=== Musicians ===
- Big John Bates, Canadian guitarist and singer
- Big John Duncan (born 1958), former guitarist for The Exploited
- John Goodison (musician) behind Big John's Rock And Roll Circus
- Big John Greer (1923–1972), American blues saxophonist and vocalist
- John Patton (musician) (1935–2002), jazz musician
- "Big" John Thomas, member of the Welsh hard rock band Budgie
- John Wallace (musician), bassist and singer
- Big John Wrencher (1923–1977), American blues harmonica player and singer

=== Other ===
- John Buscema (1927-2002), American comic book artist
- John Castelle (born 1959), American mobster, a capo of the Lucchese crime family
- John Cornyn (born 1952), U.S. Senator from Texas
- John McMichael (1948-1987), Northern Ireland loyalist killed by the Provisional IRA
- John Fisher (social media personality) (born 1973), English social media personality
- Giovanni "Big John" Ormento, gangster involved in the French Connection
- Big John, bodyguard of rocker Bret Michaels who appeared on Rock of Love with Bret Michaels (season 1)

== Art and media ==
- "Big John (Ain't You Gonna Marry Me)", a 1961 song by The Shirelles
- "Big John", a working title of the ABBA song "Move On"
- "Big Bad John", country song by Jimmy Dean
- Big John, Little John, 1976 American TV series
- "Big John" Cannon, protagonist of the American TV series The High Chaparral

== Places ==
- Big John Bay, Kupreanof Island, Alaska
- A nickname for the John Hancock Center in Chicago, Illinois
- Big John Butte, a mountain in Montana

== Other ==
- Big John (brand), Japanese denim company
- Big John Steak & Onion, a sub chain based in Michigan
- A nickname of the US aircraft carrier USS John F. Kennedy (CV-67)
- Big John (dinosaur), fossilized triceratops

== See also ==
- Jon Arthur, the host of the Saturday morning children's radio series Big Jon and Sparkie
- Little John (disambiguation)
