= Raimund Pechotsch =

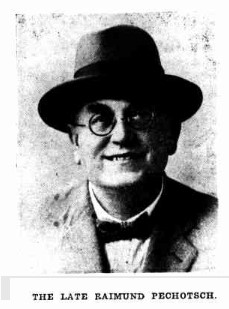
Raimund Pechotsch

Raimund Leo Pechotsch (23 July 1864 – 20 January 1941) was a composer of romantic and incidental musical theatre pieces. He was a Roman Catholic who also conducted liturgical music.

== Life ==
Pechotsch was born in Vienna, his father Adalbert Pechotsch being a composer of some note. He studied at the Vienna Conservatoire and privately under Eduard Remenyi. He was one of three brothers who were members of the Austrian Strauss Band in 1880: Raimund on first violin; Adolf and Rupert both on contra-bass and trumpet. The band had been contracted to perform at the Melbourne Exhibition of 1881. He remained in Australia, but moved to Sydney.

He was in Brisbane then left for New Zealand 1889.

Pechotsch was musical director for Australian stage producer Oscar Asche. Raimund also worked for music publisher Palings and taught violin and piano in Sydney for many years.

Pechotsch wrote incidental music for Walter Howard's 1910 play The Prince and the Beggar Maid which was very successful in London and Australia. He also wrote music (orchestrated for ensemble of twenty) to accompany "Pete" a Lewis Parker stage adaptation of Hall Caine's novel The Manxman.

Later in life he remarried Alice McCarthy, the daughter of fellow Australian composer Dr William Charles MacCarthy.

== Works ==
- The cycling schottische
- A lost love with words by Frederick Augustus Packer
- Emu waltz (1896)
- For thee : song with violin obligato with words by Ernest Glanville-Hicks (father of Peggy Glanville-Hicks)
- Fire a shot for the Empire with foreign journalist Dulcie Deamer
- To a butterfly with Australian poet Agnes Littlejohn (1865-1944)
- Sympathy Waltz
- Gem Waltz
- Cradle song : Chant du berceau, written for Hall Caine's Pete
- Romance, for violin with piano accompaniment
- Liebslied (1915), written after the death of his son
- My love and I (boat song) with lyrics by Marie Van Brakkel
- Tears and pearls with lyrics by Henry C. de Witt
- Monsieur Beaucaire waltz

== Family ==
On 17 September 1885 Pechotsch married Mary Elizabeth Curtis (born 1858 – 23 December), née Dolman, widow of Peter Campbell Curtis and mother of William John Curtis, KC.(1 September 1881 – 24 May 1940)

- Raimund Adalbert Pechotsch, aka Jan Rudenyi, (born 1 August 1886 – February 1915) was feted as a violin prodigy, having received his entire musical training from his father.

He had ten years education in Europe and returned to Australia in his twenties.

- Eric Joachim Pechotsch, aka Eric Mareo (30 September 1891 – 1958), as a boy was a charming singer of humorous songs and later as musical director of the Ernest Rolls Revue and in 1935 of his own orchestra, a dandy who affected a long white cigarette holder and conducted with a tinsel-covered baton. He was convicted in Auckland, New Zealand, of the murder of his second wife Thelma née Trott, who died 15 April 1935 by Veronal poisoning. Thelma's lesbian lover Freda Stark was a key witness at the trial.

Around 1938 he married again, to the widow O'Hara, née MacCarthy, daughter of Dr Charles MacCarthy, an Irish Home Rule activist. MacCarthy was frequently written M'Carthy.

He had two brothers in Australia:

- Rupert Joseph Pechotsch ( –1941) married Ada Euphemia Norris (c. 1863 – 15 March 1944) on 28 February 1882 lived Numurkah, Victoria, later Highett, Victoria insolvent 1916
- Adolf Pechotsch (c. 1856 – October 1902) married Matilda Eppin (c. 1861 – 13 March 1885); and a second time to the widow Waldock c. 1896.
