= Little John (disambiguation) =

Little John is one of Robin Hood's Merry Men.

Little John may also refer to:

== People ==
- Nicholas Owen (Jesuit) (c. 1562-1606), martyred Jesuit lay brother and saint who used the alias "Little John"
- Little John (musician) (born 1970), Jamaican dancehall artist
- John Nee, Irish actor with the stage name Little John Nee
- Rowby-John Rodriguez (born 1994), Austrian darts player who uses the nickname "Little John"

== Arts and entertainment ==
- Little John (film), a 2001 multilingual fantasy film
- Little John, a 2002 TV movie starring Ving Rhames
- a title character in the 1976 American sitcom Big John, Little John
- "Little John" Warner, a character in the 1998-2000 American sitcom Jesse
- "Little John", a 2002 Hallmark Hall of Fame TV episode

== Other uses ==
- Little John (archeological site), one of Canada's oldest human occupation archaeological sites
- MGR-3 Little John, an artillery rocket used by the United States Army in the 1960s
- Little John, a ship that was part of the 1590 Watts' West Indies and Virginia expedition and the 1591 Blockade of Western Cuba
- Little John, the bell in the Nottingham Council House

== See also ==
- Lil Jon (born 1971), American rapper
- Lil' John, born John Rinaldi (born 1946), of the Big Chuck and Lil' John US television duo
- Littlejohn (disambiguation)
- Shoneen, derogatory Irish term for those expressing pro-English sentiments, literally meaning "Little John"
- Big John (disambiguation)
