= Litteljohn =

Litteljohn is an English surname. Notable people with the surname include:

- Arthur Litteljohn (1881–1919), English cricketer
- Edward Litteljohn (1878–1955), English cricketer

== See also ==
- Littlejohn (disambiguation)
