= Agnes Littlejohn =

Australian writer

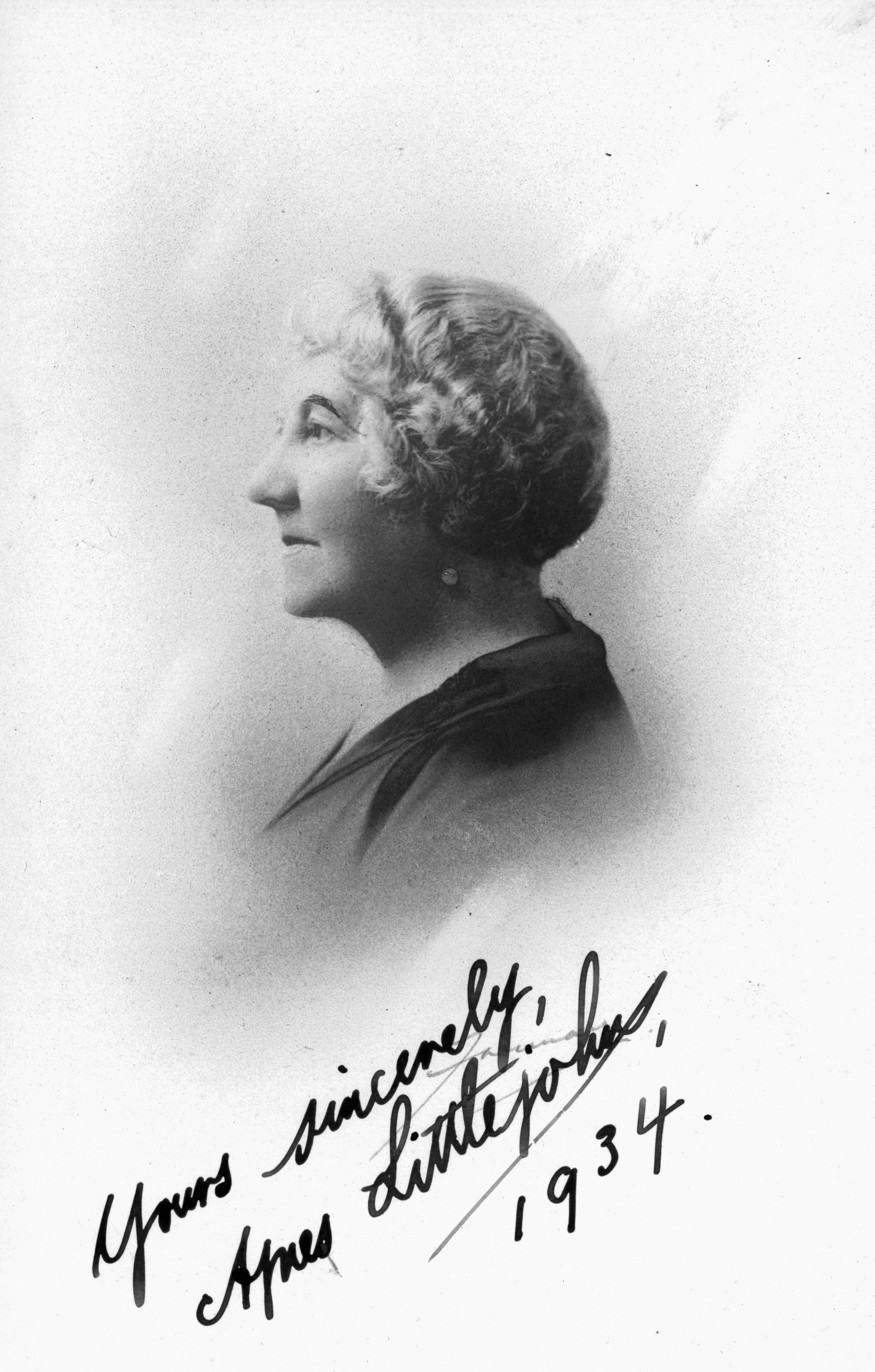
- Born: 25 September 1865; Paddington, New South Wales, Australia
- Died: 27 December 1944 (aged 79); Epping, New South Wales, Australia
- Occupations: Poet, short story writer, children's author

Agnes Littlejohn (25 September 1865 – 27 December 1944) was an Australian writer.

== Life ==
Agnes Littlejohn was born in Paddington, New South Wales on 25 September 1865. Her Scottish father, Thomas Littlejohn (d.1906) and his wife Ann Austin Littlejohn (née Orsmond in Tahiti) had migrated to Australia in 1864.

Littlejohn had paintings in the Australian Academy of Arts Exhibition in 1892.

Her first collection of short stories was published in 1907, the year following her father's death, and was reviewed favourably by The Sydney Morning Herald. It contained both new stories and others which had previously been published in the Presbyterian. From November 1907 her stories appeared in the "Young Folks" and "Australian Stories" columns of The Sydney Mail.

Following the outbreak of World War I, Littlejohn began writing patriotic poetry which was published in The Sydney Mail. It was collected and re-published in a series of volumes during the war years. She also donated earnings from her writing to patriotic funds.

Her first book of fairy stories for children, Star Dust and Sea Spray, appeared in 1918 and was illustrated by Sydney Ure Smith and Percy Leason, while Pixie O'Harris illustrated her 1924 book, The Lost Emerald and other Stories.

She also wrote the lyrics for the song, "To a Butterfly", composed by Raimund Pechotsch in 1925. It was dedicated to and sung by Elsa Stralia.

In 1931 she began to write poetry for The Sydney Morning Herald.

== Works ==
=== Prose ===
- The Daughter of a Sailor and other stories (1907)
- A Lapse of Memory and other stories (1909)
- Mirage of the Desert (1910)
- The Breath of India (1914)
- The Silver Road and other stories (1915)
- Star Dust and Sea Spray (1918)
- Rainbow Dreams (1919)
- The Lost Emerald and other Stories (1924)
- The Pipes O' Pan and other short stories (1939)

=== Poetry ===
- Verses (1914)
- Patriotic Poems (1915)
- Verses (1915)
- War Poems, dedicated to Australian soldiers (1916)
- The Lady of the Doves and other poems (1929)
- The Guardian of the Gate and other poems (1933)
- The Unforgotten Watch and other poems (1935)
- Drowsy Hours and other poems (1936)
- Lighthouse Keepers and other poems (1938)

=== Prose and poetry ===
- The Sleeping Sea-Nymph (1921)
- Lyrics and Lyrical Prose (1927)
- Lyrics and Mystic Sketches (1928)

== Later life and death ==
Littlejohn died on 27 December 1944 at a private hospital in Epping, New South Wales. She never married.
