= USS John F. Kennedy (CV-67) =

Kitty Hawk-class aircraft carrier (active 1968–2007)

Coordinates: 39°53′07″N 75°10′46″W

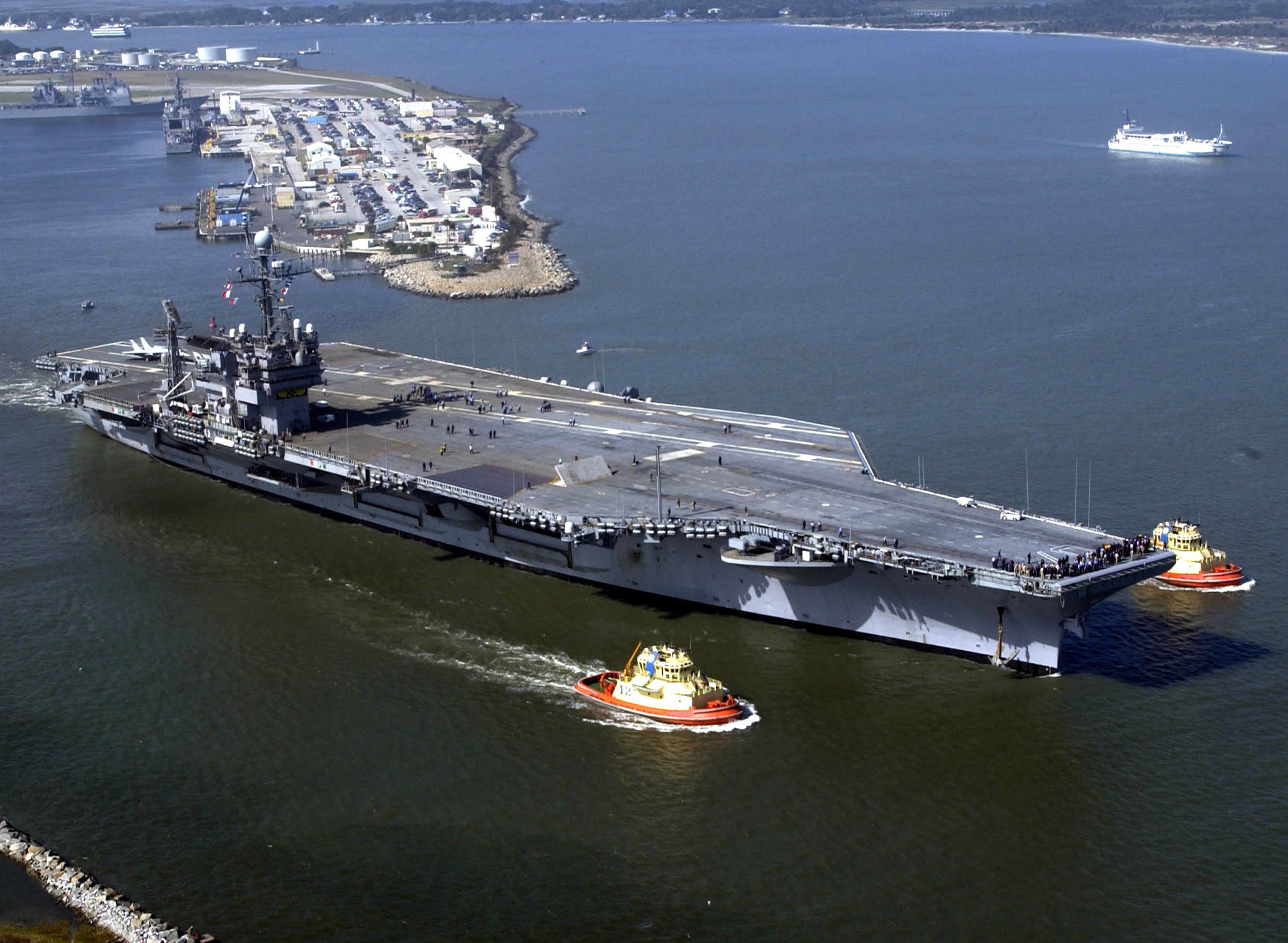
- USS John F. Kennedy leaving NS Mayport, Florida in November 2003

Class overview
- Name: John F. Kennedy-class
- Builders: Newport News Shipbuilding
- Operators: United States Navy
- Preceded by: Kitty Hawk class and Enterprise class
- Succeeded by: Nimitz class
- In commission: 7 September 1968 – 1 August 2007

History

United States
- Name: John F. Kennedy
- Namesake: John F. Kennedy
- Awarded: 30 April 1964
- Builder: Newport News Shipbuilding
- Laid down: 22 October 1964
- Launched: 27 May 1967
- Sponsored by: Caroline Kennedy
- Christened: 27 May 1967
- Acquired: 31 August 1968
- Commissioned: 7 September 1968
- Decommissioned: 23 March 2007
- Reclassified: CV-67, 1 December 1974
- Refit: 1984
- Stricken: 16 October 2009
- Identification: Callsign: NJFK
- Motto: Date Nolite Rogare; (Latin for "Give, do not ask"; cf. "Ask not what your country can do for you; ask what you can do for your country")
- Nickname(s): "Big John" (unofficially: "Bldg 67", "Can Opener", "Jack the Tin Can Killer")
- Fate: Scrapped
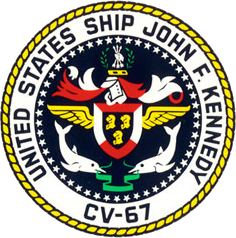
- Badge

General characteristics
- Type: Aircraft carrier
- Displacement: 60,728 long tons (61,702 t); 82,655 long tons (83,981 t) full load; 21,927 DWT
- Length: 1,052 ft (321 m) overall, 990 ft (300 m) waterline
- Beam: 252 ft (77 m) extreme, 130 ft (40 m) waterline
- Height: 192 ft (59 m) from top of the mast to the waterline
- Draft: 36 ft (11 m) maximum, 37 ft (11 m) limit
- Installed power: 8 × Babcock & Wilcox boilers, 1,200 psi (8,300 kPa); 280,000 shp (210 MW)
- Propulsion: 4 × steam turbines; 4 shafts
- Speed: 34 knots (63 km/h; 39 mph)
- Capacity: 5,000+
- Complement: 3,297 officers and men (without jet commands & crews)
- Armament: 2 × GMLS Mk 29 launchers for Sea Sparrow missiles; 2 × Phalanx CIWS; 2 × RAM launchers
- Aircraft carried: 80+

USS John F. Kennedy (hull number CV-67; formerly CVA-67), the only ship of her class, was an aircraft carrier, formerly of the United States Navy. Considered a supercarrier, she was a variant of the Kitty Hawk class, and the last conventionally-powered carrier built for the Navy, as all carriers since have had nuclear propulsion. Commissioned in 1968, the ship was named after John F. Kennedy, the 35th president of the United States. John F. Kennedy was originally designated a CVA, for fixed-wing attack carrier, however the designation was changed to CV, for fleet carrier.

After nearly 40 years of service, John F. Kennedy was decommissioned on 1 August 2007. She was berthed at the NAVSEA Inactive Ships On-site Maintenance facility in Philadelphia, formerly the Philadelphia Naval Shipyard, and, until late 2017, was available for donation as a museum and memorial to a qualified organization. In late 2017, the Navy revoked her "donation hold" status and designated her for dismantling.

On 16 January 2025, John F. Kennedy left the Philadelphia Naval Shipyard and started the voyage to Brownsville, Texas, where she will be scrapped. She arrived at Brownsville on 2 February 2025 for her final arrival.

She has been succeeded by the Gerald R. Ford-class aircraft carrier Pre-Commissioning Unit John F. Kennedy (CVN-79), laid down in July 2015, launched in October 2019, and scheduled to enter service in March 2027, after missing the delivery date July 2025.

== Ship history ==
=== Design and early years ===
Designed under Ship Characteristics Board project SCB-127C, the ship's keel was laid on inclined Shipway 8 at Newport News Shipbuilding on 22 October 1964. Initial construction proceeded on the inclined way for several months, during which a 280-foot midbody "machinery box" section (between frames 93 and 163, extending to the fourth deck and out to the second longitudinal bulkhead) was erected. To reduce occupancy time in the graving dock, this section was subsequently launched from Shipway 8 and transferred to Shipway 11, where final assembly and construction continued until the ship's launch. The ship was christened 27 May 1967 by Jacqueline Kennedy and her 9-year-old daughter, Caroline, two days short of what would have been President Kennedy's 50th birthday. The ship entered service 7 September 1968.

John F. Kennedy is a modified version of the earlier Kitty Hawk-class aircraft carriers. Originally scheduled to be the fourth Kitty Hawk-class carrier, the ship received so many modifications during construction she formed her own class. The ship was originally ordered as a nuclear carrier, using the A3W reactor, but converted to conventional propulsion after construction had begun. The island is somewhat different from that of the Kitty Hawk class, with angled funnels to direct smoke and gases away from the flight deck. John F. Kennedy is also 17 feet (5.2 m) shorter than the Kitty Hawk class.

After an operational readiness inspection (ORI) conducted by Commander, Carrier Division Two, John F. Kennedy left for the Mediterranean Sea in April 1969. The ship reached Rota, Spain on the morning of 22 April 1969 and relieved USS Forrestal. Rear Admiral Pierre N. Charbonnet, Commander, Carrier Striking Forces, Sixth Fleet, and Commander, Carrier Striking Unit 60.1.9, shifted his flag to John F. Kennedy. The turnover complete by nightfall, the carrier, escorted by destroyers, transited the Strait of Gibraltar at the start of the mid watch on 22 April. The next day, John F. Kennedy refueled from USS Marias, and acquired the company of a Soviet Kotlin-class destroyer (Pennant No. 383).

=== 1970s ===
John F. Kennedy's maiden voyage, and several of her subsequent voyages, were on deployments to the Mediterranean during much of the 1970s to help deal with the steadily deteriorating situation in the Middle East. During the 1970s John F. Kennedy was upgraded to handle the F-14 Tomcat and the S-3 Viking.

After her 1973 overhaul, John F. Kennedy was planned to deploy to Vietnam but her orders were changed to deploy European waters after the signing of the Paris Peace Accords. John F. Kennedy was involved in the Navy response to the Yom Kippur War in the Middle East in October 1973, with her actions and the larger U.S. Navy picture being described in Elmo Zumwalt's book On Watch. In 1974, she won the Marjorie Sterrett Battleship Fund Award for the Atlantic Fleet.

On 20 June 1975, John F. Kennedy was the target of possible arson, suffering eight fires, with no injuries, while at port in Norfolk, Virginia. On 22 November 1975, John F. Kennedy collided with the cruiser Belknap, severely damaging the smaller ship. As a result of the collision with John F. Kennedy's overhanging deck, JP-5 fuel lines were ruptured spraying fuel over an adjacent catwalk, and fires ensued aboard both ships. Belknap's superstructure was gutted almost to the main deck, and seven of her crew killed. Aboard John F. Kennedy, smoke inhalation claimed the life of Yeoman 2nd Class David A. Chivalette of VF-14, CVW-1.

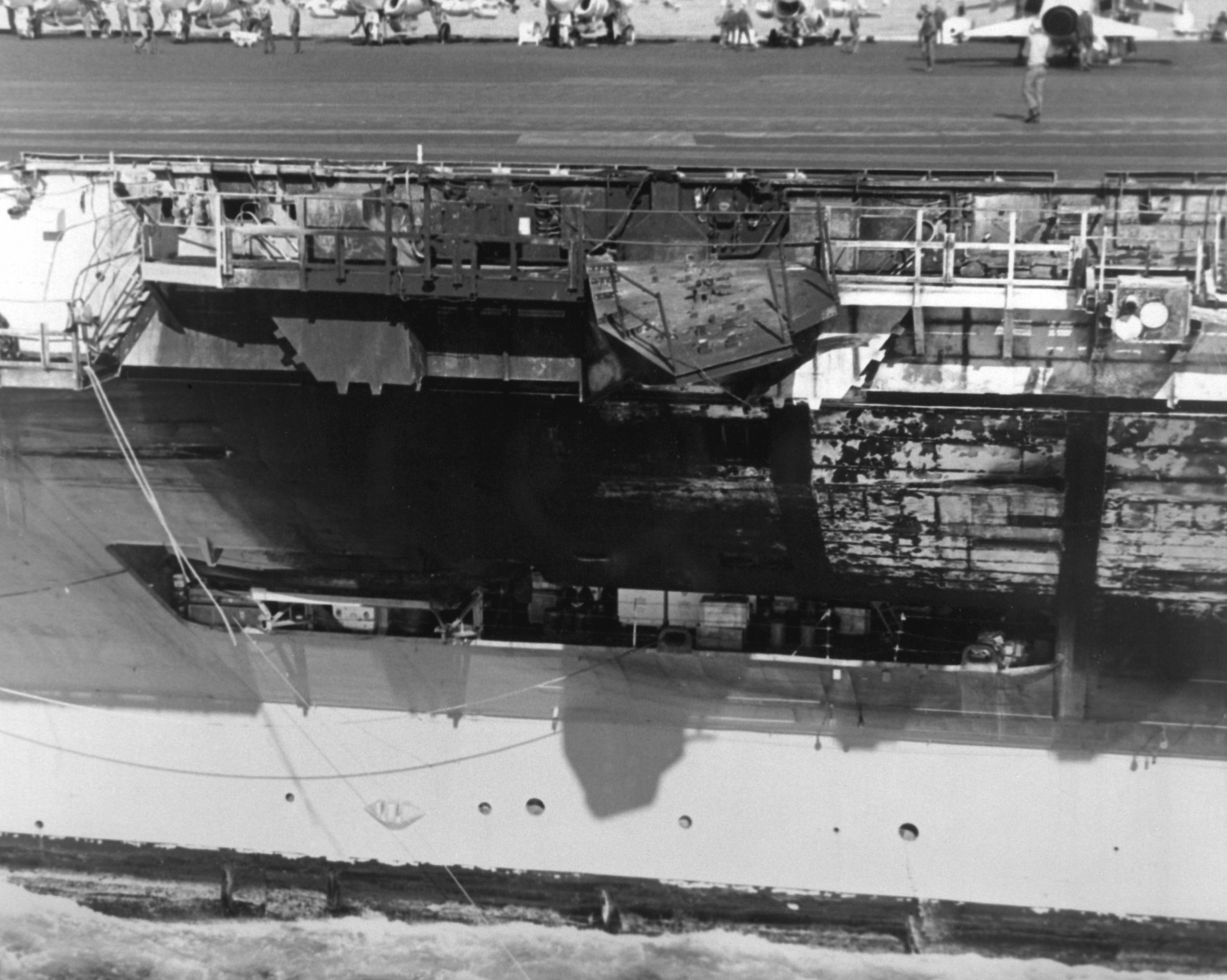
A view of damage sustained by John F. Kennedy when she collided with the cruiser USS Belknap

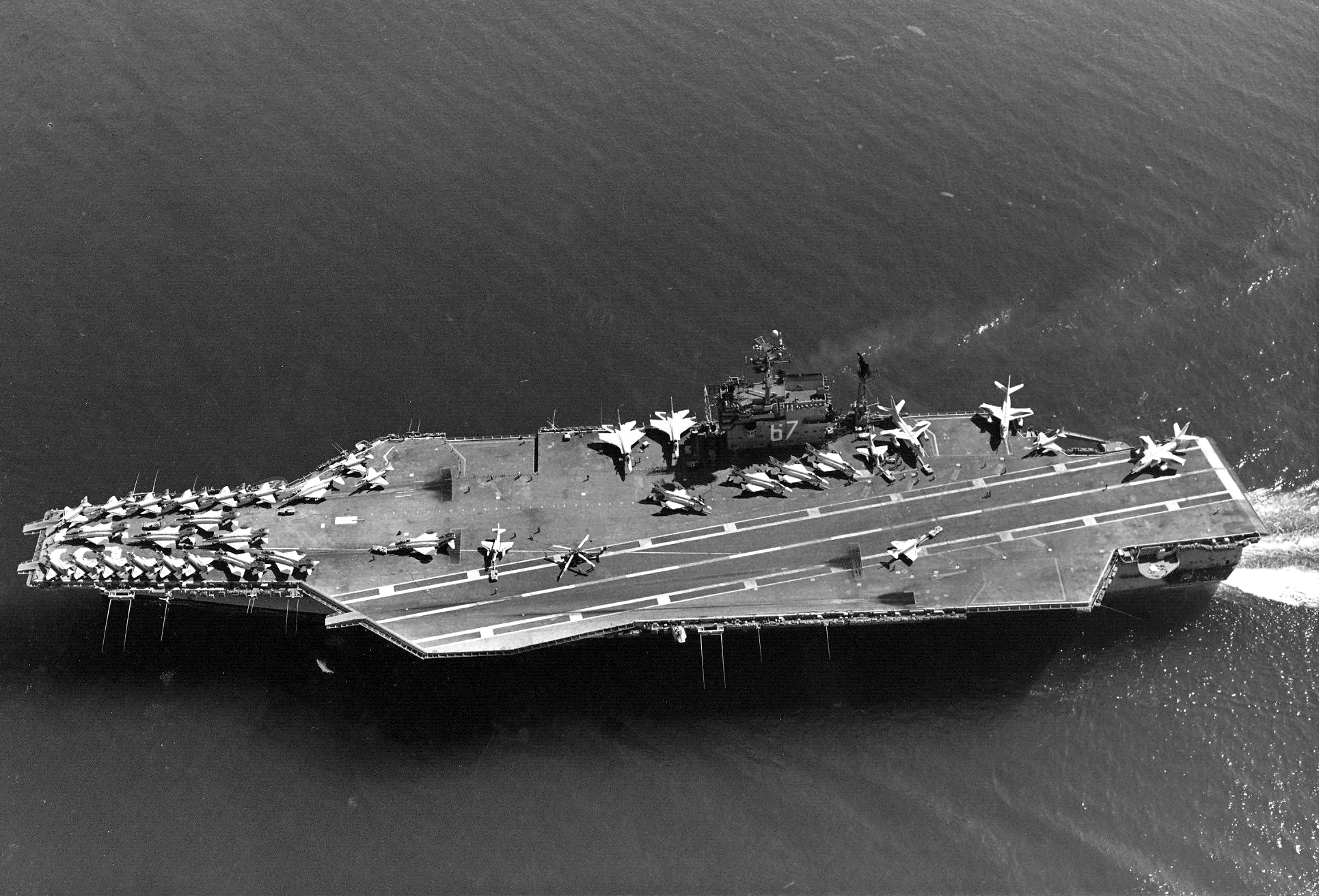
John F. Kennedy on her initial shakedown cruise in December 1968

On 14 September 1976, while conducting a nighttime underway replenishment 100 miles (160 km) north of Scotland, the destroyer Bordelon lost control and collided with John F. Kennedy, resulting in such severe damage to the destroyer that she was removed from service in 1977. Earlier the same day, one F-14 Tomcat, following a problem with the catapult, fell off of the flight deck of John F. Kennedy, with AIM-54 Phoenix missiles in international waters, off the coast of Scotland. Both crew members ejected and landed on the deck, injured but alive. A naval race (surface and submarine) followed between the Soviet Navy and U.S. Navy to get back not only the plane (because of its weapon system), but also its missiles. After a prolonged search involving USS Shakori (ATF-162) and contractors from UK and Germany, the U.S. Navy retrieved the aircraft and its missiles.

In 1979 John F. Kennedy underwent her first year-long overhaul, which was completed in 1980. While the carrier was at Norfolk Naval Shipyard, Virginia for the overhaul, arson attacks were carried out on the ship on two occasions. On 9 April 1979, she experienced five fires which killed one shipyard worker and injured 34 others, and on 5 June 1979 the carrier was the target of two more fires; no one was injured in the latter incident. In 1979 she won her second Marjorie Sterrett Battleship Fund Award.

=== 1980s ===
On 4 August 1980, John F. Kennedy left Norfolk, Virginia and voyaged to the Mediterranean Sea.

On 4 January 1982, John F. Kennedy, with Carrier Air Wing Three (AC), sailed as the flagship for Carrier Group Four (CCG-4) from Norfolk, Va. on her ninth deployment, and her first visit to the Indian Ocean after port visits to St. Thomas, U.S. Virgin Islands, Malaga, Spain, and transiting the Suez Canal. In her time in the Indian Ocean John F. Kennedy conducted her only port visit to Perth/Fremantle, Western Australia, anchoring in Gage Roads on 19 March 1982 for a R&R visit, departing on 25 March back to the Indian Ocean. During this time John F. Kennedy played host to the first visit of the Somali head of state, President Mohammed Siad Barre. Her cruise ended with port visits to Mombasa, Kenya and Toulon, France, and another visit to Malaga, Spain before returning home on 14 July 1982.

In October 1983 John F. Kennedy, with Commander, Carrier Group 6 (CCG-6) embarked, was diverted to Beirut, Lebanon from her planned Indian Ocean deployment, after the Beirut barracks bombing killed 241 U.S. military personnel taking part in the Multinational Force in Lebanon, and spent the rest of that year and early 1984 patrolling the region. On 4 December 1983 ten A-6 aircraft from John F. Kennedy along with A-6 and A-7 aircraft from USS Independence took part in a bombing raid over Beirut, in response to two U.S. F-14 TARPS equipped aircraft being fired upon the previous day. The Navy lost two aircraft during the raid: an A-7E from Independence and an A-6E from John F. Kennedy were shot down by SAMs. The A-7E pilot was picked up by a fishing boat, but the A-6E pilot Lt. Mark Lange died after ejecting and the B/N Lt. Robert "Bobby" Goodman was taken prisoner and released on 3 January 1984. An additional A-7 was hit by a missile but it successfully returned to USS Independence.

In 1984 the ship was drydocked at the Norfolk Naval Shipyard for a one-and-a-half-year complex overhaul and upgrades.

In 1985 John F. Kennedy received the initial awarding of the Department of Defense Phoenix Award for Maintenance Excellence for having the best maintenance department in the entire Department of Defense.

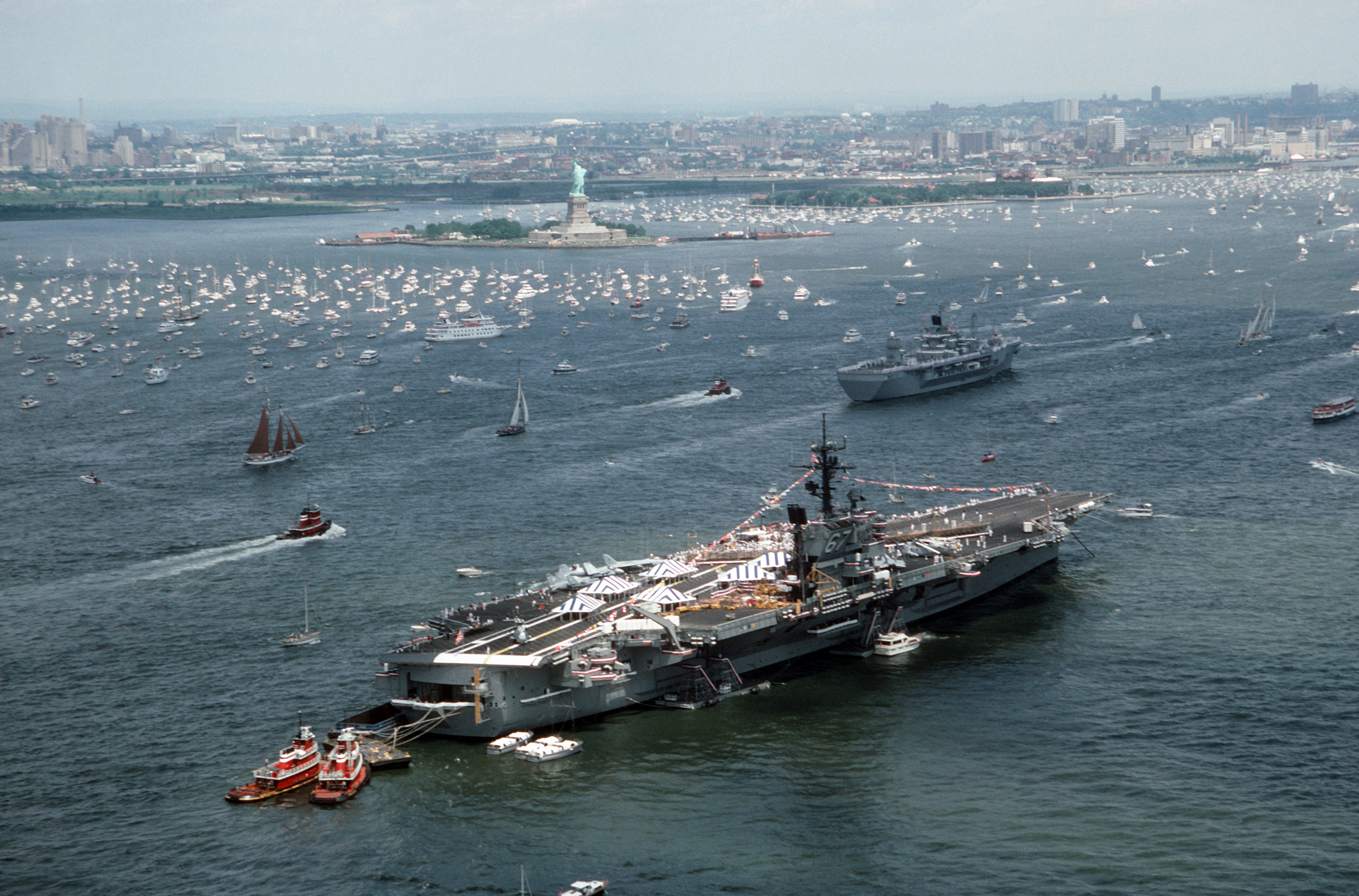
An elevated starboard quarter view of John F. Kennedy during the International Naval Review in New York Harbor, 4 July 1986

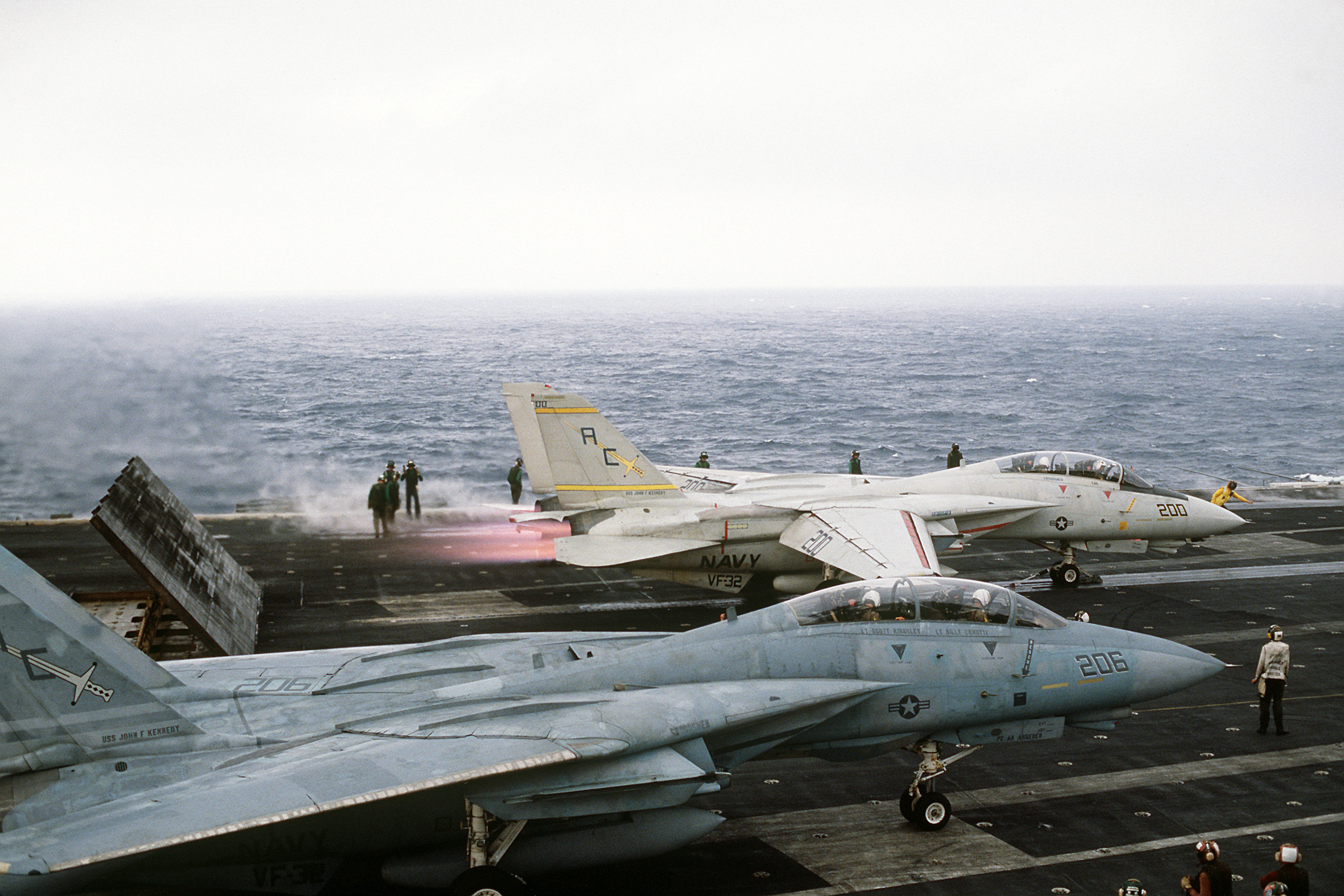
An F-14A of VF-32 prepares to launch from John F. Kennedy during her 1986 Mediterranean cruise.

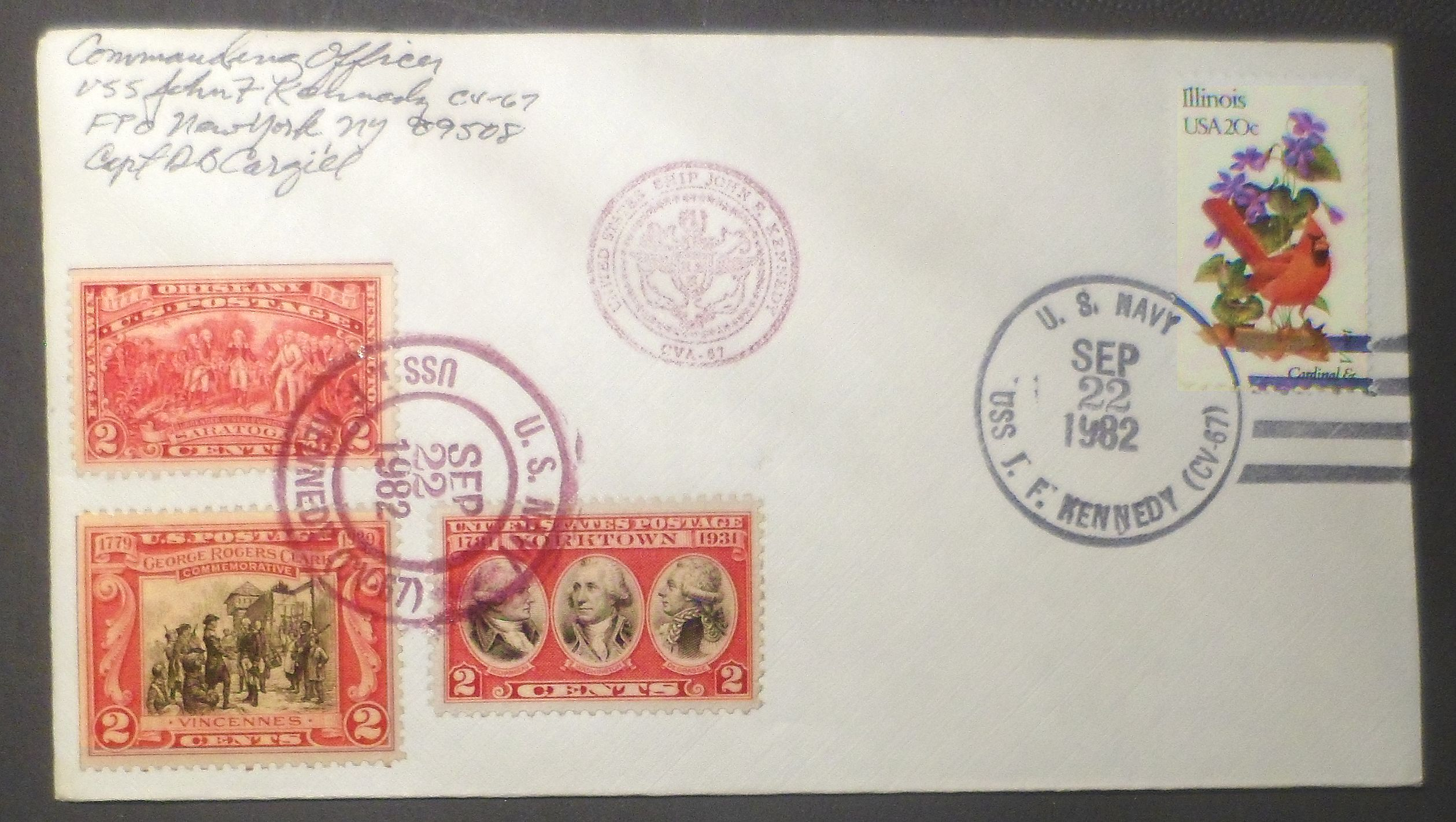
US Naval Cover, 22 September 1982 Signed by Commanding Officer, Denny Bruce Cargill

Setting sail in July 1986, John F. Kennedy participated in the International Naval Review to help mark the Re-dedication of the Statue of Liberty. John F. Kennedy served as the flagship for the armada before departing on her eleventh overseas deployment to the Mediterranean in August – highlighted by multiple Freedom of Navigation exercises in the Gulf of Sidra, and operations off of the coast of Lebanon as a response to increasing terrorist activities and U.S. citizens being taken hostage in Beirut. The ship returned to Norfolk, Virginia in March 1987 and was dry-docked a second time for fifteen months for critical upgrades and major repairs.

In August 1988 John F. Kennedy departed on her twelfth overseas deployment. During this deployment, a pair of MiG-23 Flogger fighter aircraft from Libya approached the carrier task force, which was 81 miles (130 km) off the shore of Libya near the declared Libyan territorial waters of the Gulf of Sidra. John F. Kennedy launched two F-14 Tomcats from VF-32 "Fighting Swordsmen" to intercept the incoming MiGs. The U.S. planes were sent to escort the MiGs away from the task force. During the course of the intercept, the MiGs were determined to be hostile and were both shot down.

=== 1990s ===
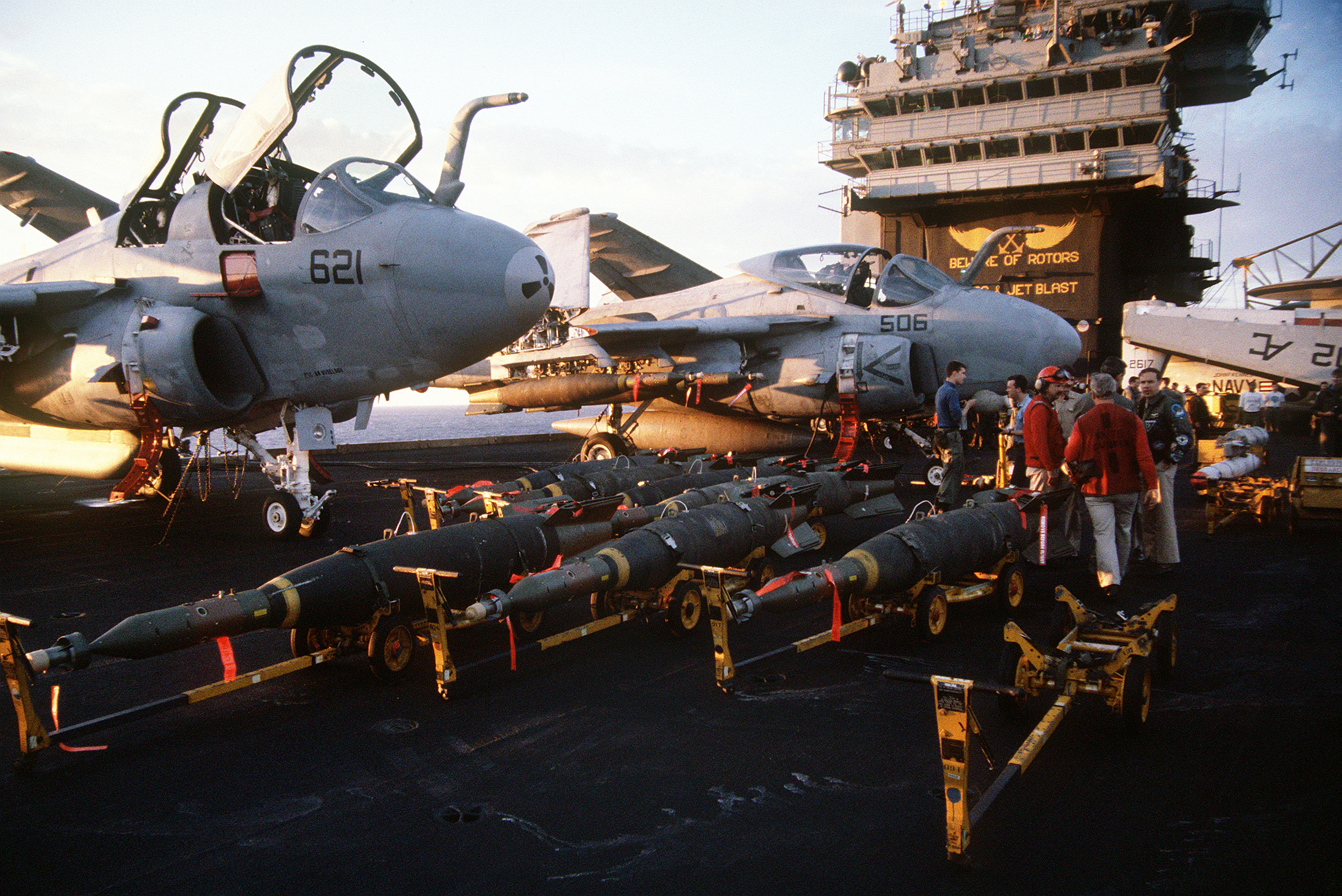
Laser-guided bombs line the flight deck of John F. Kennedy in preparation for air strikes against Iraq during Operation Desert Storm on 23 January 1991. The A-6E Intruder aircraft in the background is armed with laser-guided bombs.

John F. Kennedy returned to the U.S. in time to participate in Fleet Week in New York and Independence Day celebrations in Boston, Massachusetts before receiving an "All-hands" recall on 10 August 1990, for Operation Desert Shield. The ship was empty of fuel, and ordnance and equipment as she was ready to join the yards for some SRA maintenance. Once the Warning order was issued, the ship went into 24-hour supplies replenishment procedures. She took on all the supplies and equipment she had just been offloading. She took on additional fuel and ordnance while crossing the Atlantic Ocean. She departed the United States combat ready faster than any ship had accomplished since the Vietnam War. She departed on 15 August 1990, and became the flagship for the commander of the Red Sea Battle Force. At midnight on 17 January 1991 John F. Kennedy's Carrier Air Wing 3 commenced the first strike operations against Iraqi forces as part of Operation Desert Storm. Between the commencement of the operation and the cease-fire, John F. Kennedy launched 114 airstrikes and nearly 2,900 sorties against Iraq, which delivered over 3.5 million pounds of ordnance. On 27 February 1991 President George H. W. Bush declared a cease-fire in Iraq, and ordered all U.S. forces to stand down. John F. Kennedy was relieved, and began the long journey home by transiting the Suez Canal. She arrived in Norfolk on 28 March 1991.

While at Norfolk the ship was placed on a four-month selective restricted-availability period as shipyard workers carried out maintenance. Extensive repairs to the flight deck, maintenance and engineering systems were made. Additionally, the ship was refitted to handle the new F/A-18C/D Hornet.

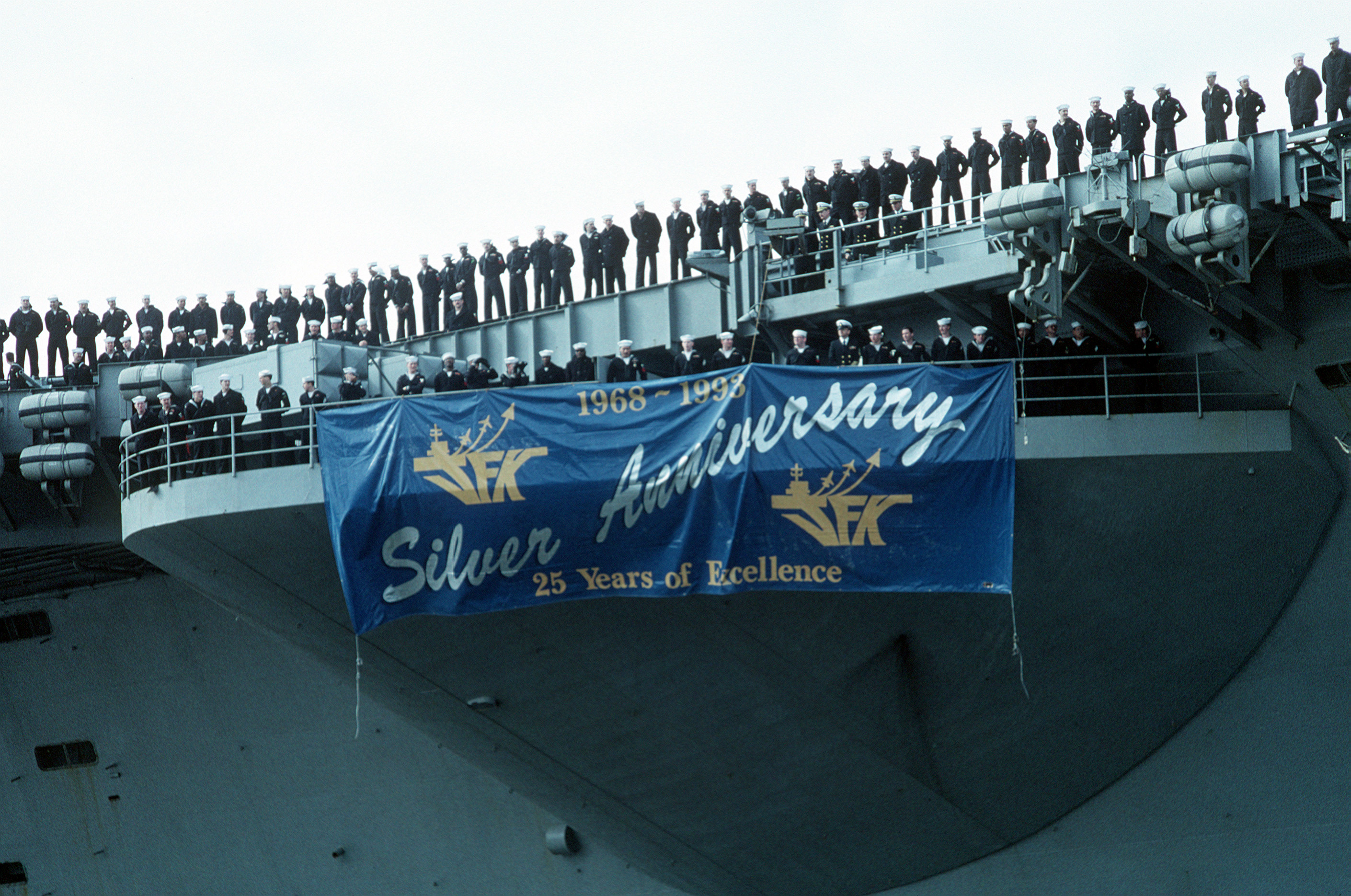
Twenty-five year "Silver Anniversary" banner hanging from the starboard bow missile sponson of John F. Kennedy, 7 April 1993

With the upgrades completed, John F. Kennedy departed on her 14th deployment to the Mediterranean, assisting several task forces with workup exercises in anticipation of intervention in Yugoslavia. When John F. Kennedy returned she was sent to the Philadelphia Naval Shipyard, where she underwent a two-year extensive overhaul. Upon completion of the overhaul the ship was transferred to the Mayport Naval Station near Jacksonville, Florida, which remained the ship's home port.

On 1 October 1995, John F. Kennedy was designated to be an operational reserve carrier and Naval Reserve Force ship with a combined full-time active duty and part-time Naval Reserve crew complement, assigned to the U.S. Atlantic Fleet. John F. Kennedy would be available to deploy with either an active or reserve carrier air wing when mobilized in support of urgent operational requirements. In this capacity, John F. Kennedy's new primary function would be to provide a surge capability, and in peacetime, to support training requirements. She would participate in routine fleet exercises, aviator carrier qualifications, and battle group training. The impetus for this initiative was post-Cold War defense spending in the mid-1990s, however, the Naval Reserve was never adequately funded to accomplish major maintenance actions for John F. Kennedy, further exacerbated by additional defense cutbacks that eliminated Carrier Air Wing Reserve 30 and the downgrading of Carrier Air Wing Reserve 20 to a non-deployable Tactical Support Wing and the return of many of the Reserve's front-line combat aircraft to the active duty force. Following the 11 September 2001 attacks on the United States, the Operational Reserve Carrier concept was discontinued and John F. Kennedy was returned to the active duty fleet and placed back in the same maintenance rotation as active duty carriers.

John F. Kennedy made a high-profile visit to Dublin, Ireland during an Atlantic deployment in 1996. Here, more than 10,000 people were invited to tour the ship at anchor in Dublin Bay. The visit was also intended to honor two personalities who had made a great impact on history: John F. Kennedy, for whom the ship was named, and Commodore John Barry, a native of County Wexford, Ireland who played an instrumental role in the early years of the United States Navy. Officers and crew from John F. Kennedy joined local military and civilian organizations in celebrating Barry's achievements at his statue in Crescent Quay, Wexford, and three F-14 Tomcat fighters flew at low level over the town. Jean Kennedy Smith, sister of John F. Kennedy, was the U.S. ambassador to Ireland at the time, and was among those who welcomed the ship to Ireland.

During her visit to Ireland, high winds in Dublin Bay caused the boarding pontoon to tear a large hole in John F. Kennedy's hull.

John F. Kennedy's 15th Mediterranean deployment included two transits of the Suez Canal, and four months deployed in the Persian Gulf. One night in the Gulf two Iranian F-14's were flying low altitude at high speed heading toward the ship. The AEGIS cruiser Vicksburg acquired the jets on radar and warned them to turn away, which they did. She returned in time to participate in Fleet Week '98 in New York City.

Shortly before John F. Kennedy's 16th deployment, she became involved in a rescue mission when the tug Gulf Majesty foundered during Hurricane Floyd in mid-September 1999. The ship successfully rescued the crew of the vessel, then headed toward the Middle East, where she became the first U.S. aircraft carrier to make a port call in Al Aqabah, Jordan, in the process playing host to the King of Jordan, before taking up station in support of Operation Southern Watch.

John F. Kennedy was the only conventionally powered U.S. carrier underway at the end of 1999, arriving back at Mayport on 19 March 2000. After a brief period of maintenance (Advanced combat direction system was installed), the carrier sailed north to participate in 4 July International Naval Review, then headed to Boston for Sail Boston 2000. The City of Boston arranged this independent event to take advantage of the transit of Tall sailing ships participating in Operation Sail 2000 as they passed by from New London, Connecticut en route to their final port-of-call in Portland, Maine.

=== 2000s ===
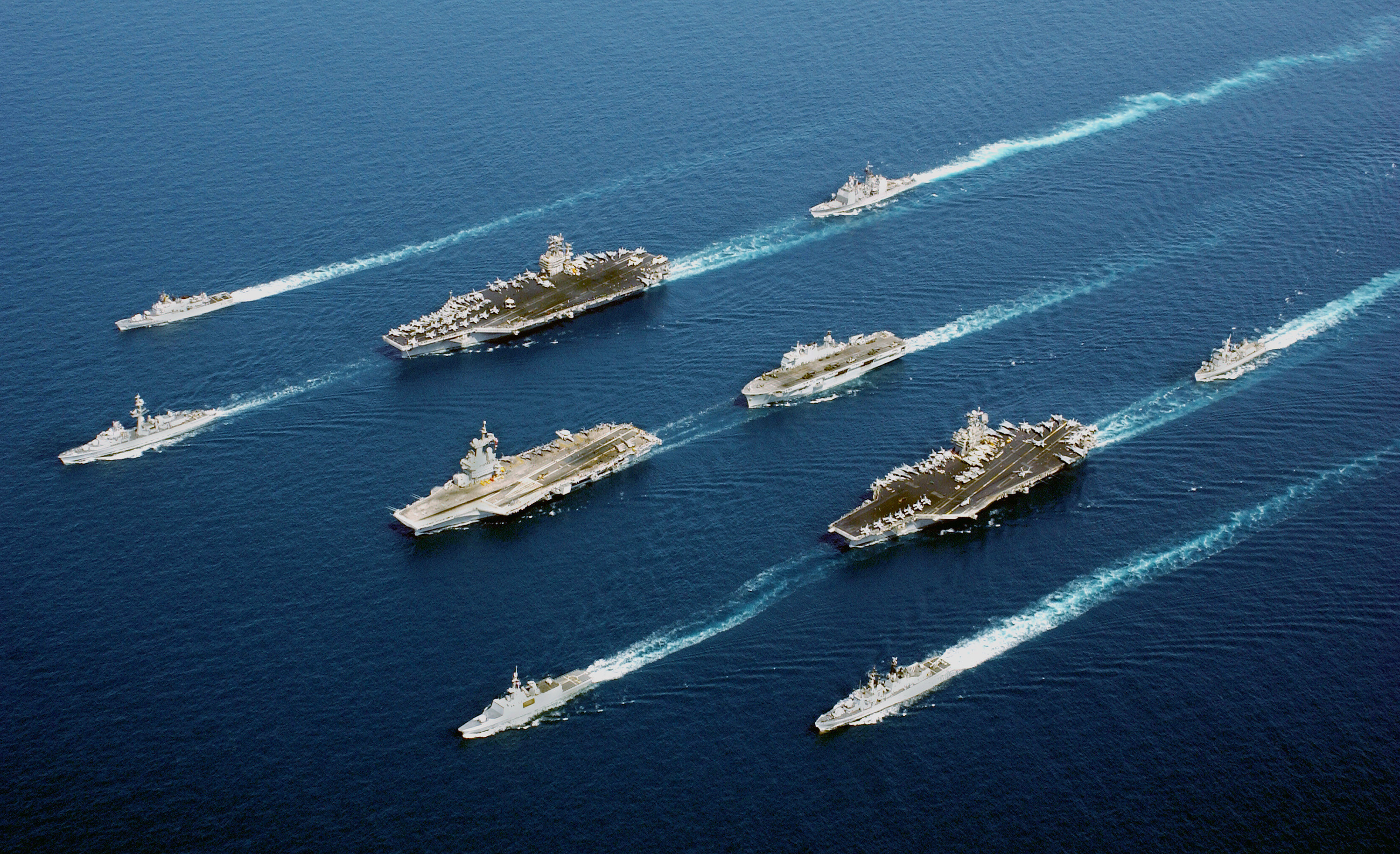
USS John F. Kennedy (center right) with ships from five nations during Operation Enduring Freedom, 16 April 2002

During John F. Kennedy's last round of refits the ship became a testbed for an experimental system for the Cooperative Engagement Capability, a system that allowed John F. Kennedy to engage targets beyond original range.

In 2001, during a pre-deployment trial, John F. Kennedy was found to be severely deficient in some respects, especially those relating to air group operations; most problematic, two aircraft catapults and three aircraft elevators, which are used to lift aircraft from the hangar deck to and from the flight deck, were non-functional during inspection, and two boilers would not light. As a result, her captain and two department heads were relieved for cause. As the 11 September attacks of 2001 unfolded, John F. Kennedy and her battle group were ordered to support Operation Noble Eagle, establishing air security along the mid-Atlantic seaboard, including Washington, D.C. John F. Kennedy was released from Noble Eagle on 14 September 2001.

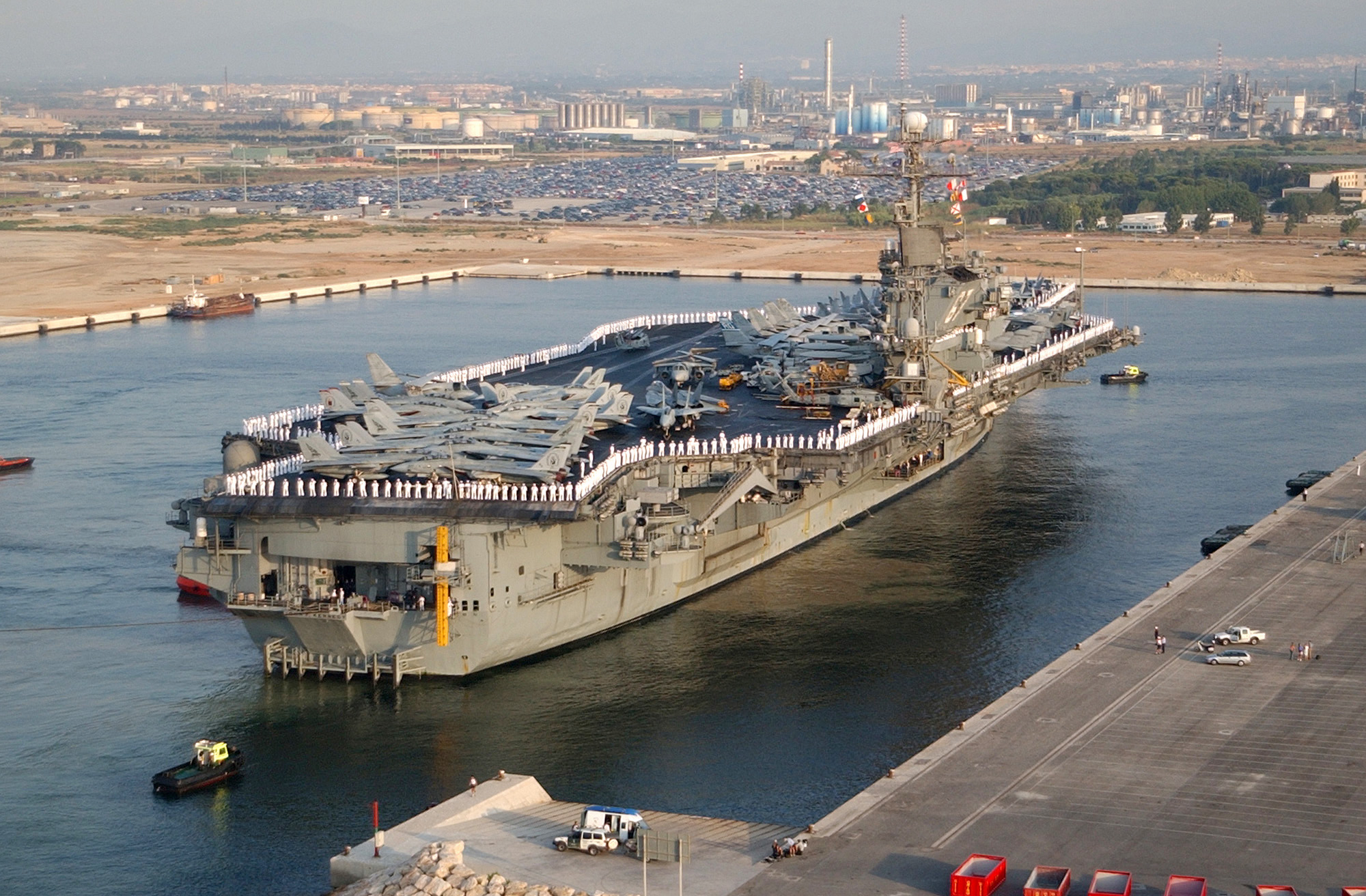
John F. Kennedy entering Port of Tarragona, 2002

During the first six months of 2002, John F. Kennedy aircraft dropped 31,000 tons of ordnance on Taliban and al Qaeda targets in support of Operation Enduring Freedom. In August 2002, John F. Kennedy visited the city of Tarragona in Spain.

In July 2004 John F. Kennedy collided with a dhow in the Persian Gulf, leaving no survivors on the traditional Arab sailing boat. After the incident the Navy relieved the commanding officer of John F. Kennedy. The carrier herself was unscathed, but two jet fighters on the deck were damaged when an F-14B Tomcat assigned to VF-103 slid into an F/A-18C Hornet assigned to VFA-81 damaging the wing of the F-14 as well as the upper section of the radome and forward windscreen of the F/A-18 as the ship made a hard turn to avoid the tiny vessel. A popular misconception is that John F. Kennedy's captain waited to make the turn at the last possible moment to recover aircraft critically low on fuel returning from airstrikes. The official review board determined this was not the case and the aircraft could have remained safely aloft until John F. Kennedy maneuvered to avoid the dhow.

John F. Kennedy was the most costly carrier in the fleet to maintain and was due for an expensive overhaul; budget cutbacks and changing naval tactics prompted the U.S. Navy to decide to retire her. On 1 April 2005 the Navy formally announced that the carrier's scheduled 15-month overhaul had been cancelled.

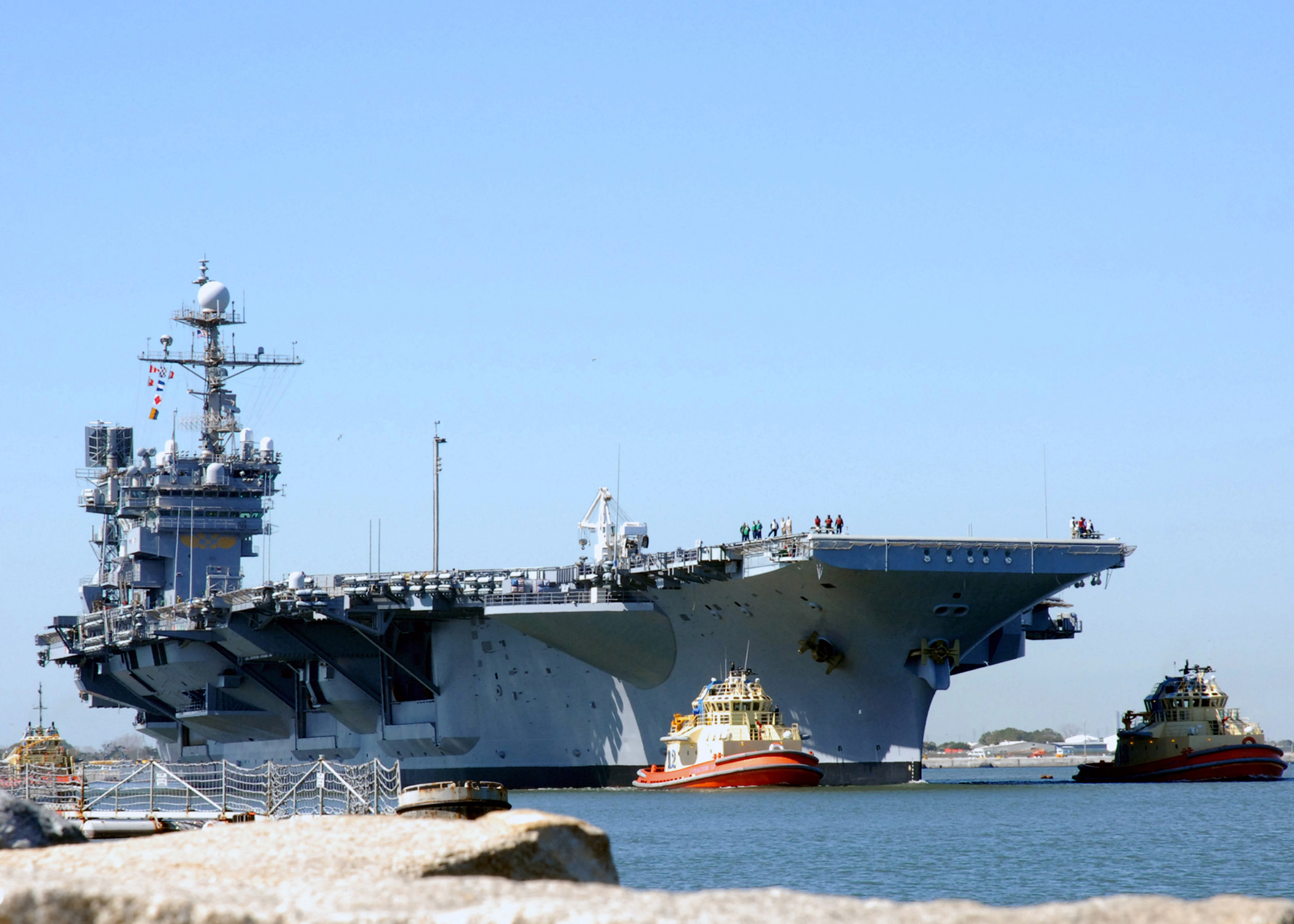
John F. Kennedy gets underway from Mayport for her final cruise, up the East Coast for Fleet Week in New York City, and then a final port visit to Boston, prior to her decommissioning in Mayport.

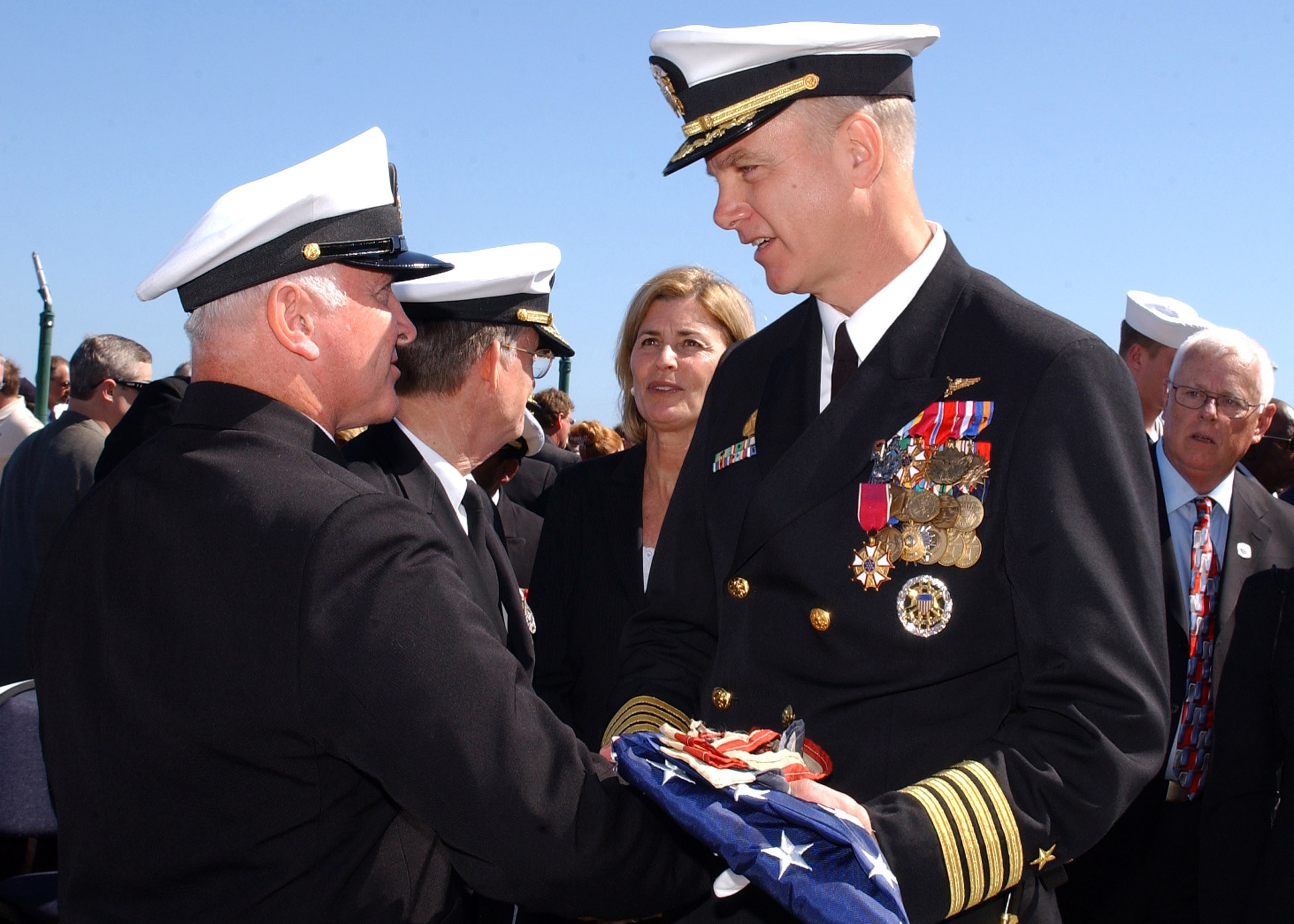
U.S. Navy Command Master Chief Charles L. Dassance presents the ensign to U.S. Navy Capt. Todd A. Zecchin, commanding officer of USS John F. Kennedy, during the ship's decommissioning ceremony.

Before decommissioning she made a number of port calls to allow the public to "say farewell" to her, including a stop at her "homeport" Boston Harbor. John F. Kennedy also took part in the 2005 New York City Fleet Week festivities at the Intrepid Sea-Air-Space Museum. She was decommissioned in Mayport, Florida on 23 March 2007.

The ship's unique in-port cabin, which was decorated by Jacqueline Kennedy with wood paneling, oil paintings, and rare artifacts, was disassembled, to be rebuilt at the National Museum of Naval Aviation at Naval Air Station Pensacola, Florida.

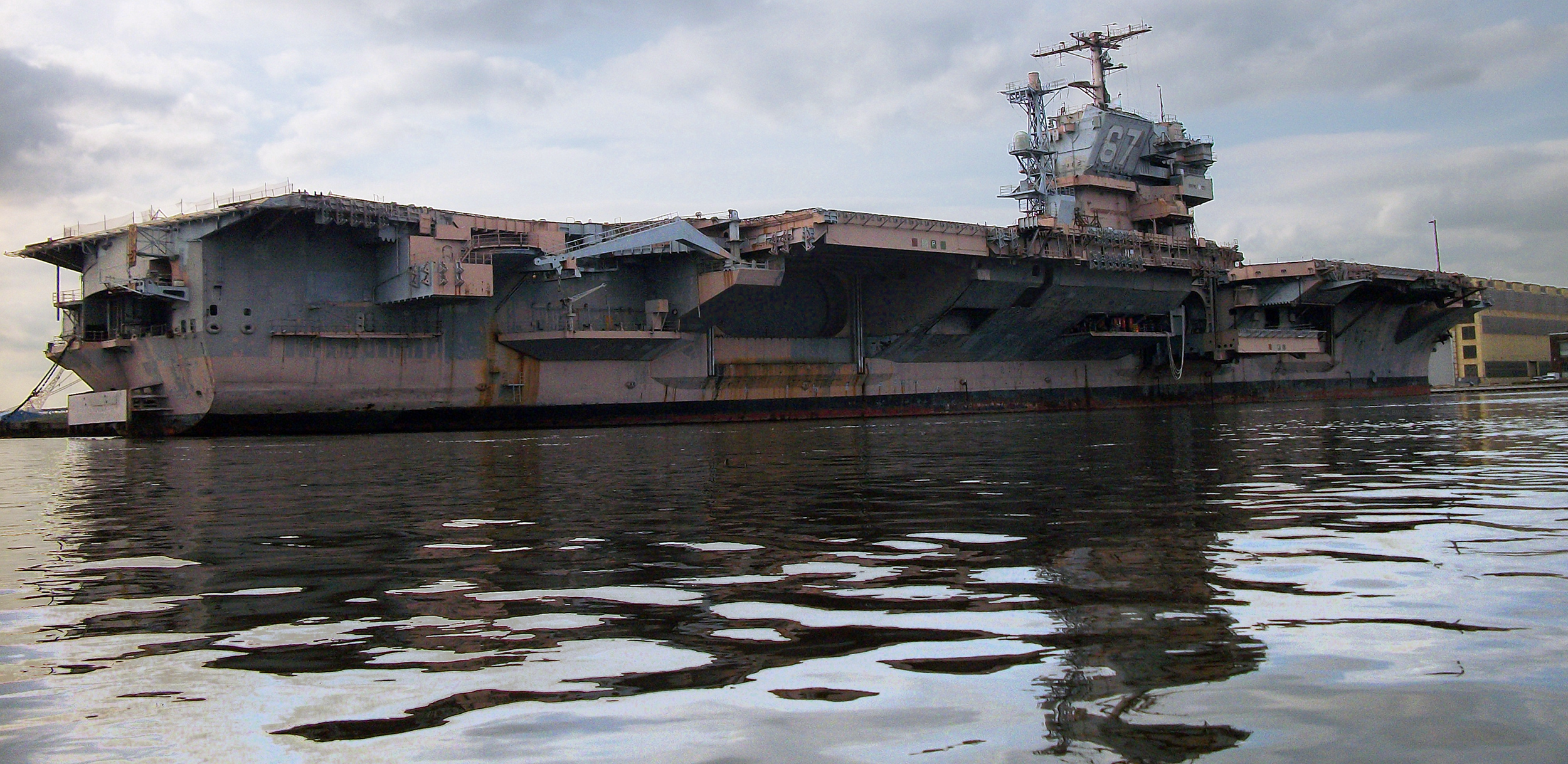
ex-John F. Kennedy docked at the Naval Inactive Ship Maintenance Facility in Philadelphia, October 2018

Ex-John F. Kennedy was towed to Norfolk, Virginia on 26 July 2007. She remained in Norfolk until a shoaled area near Pier 4 in Philadelphia could be dredged to enable the ship to safely dock. On 17 March 2008 at about 1700, she was seen leaving Norfolk Naval Station under tow of the tug Atlantic Salvor. On 22 March 2008 ex-John F. Kennedy arrived, with the afternoon high tide, at the Naval Inactive Ship Maintenance Facility in Philadelphia.

=== Retirement ===
In November 2009, the Navy placed John F. Kennedy on donation hold for use as a museum and memorial. A report in the Boston Herald newspaper on 26 November 2009 mentioned the possibility of bringing John F. Kennedy to the Boston, Massachusetts area, as a museum or memorial at no cost to the city, if desired.

In August 2010, two groups successfully passed into Phase II of the U.S. Navy Ship Donation Program:

- Rhode Island Aviation Hall of Fame, Providence, Rhode Island
- USS John F. Kennedy Museum, Portland, Maine

On 4 January 2010, Portland, Maine City Council unanimously endorsed the efforts of the USS John F. Kennedy Museum while Gov. John Baldacci also offered his support. One year later on 19 January 2011 the Portland, Maine City Council voted 9–0 to not continue with the project to bring the ship to Maine.

Plans as of September 2014 had the Rhode Island Aviation Hall of Fame working to secure Pier 2 of the Naval Station Newport. These developments come after the former USS Saratoga (CV-60) was sold for scrapping earlier after years of being moored in Newport.

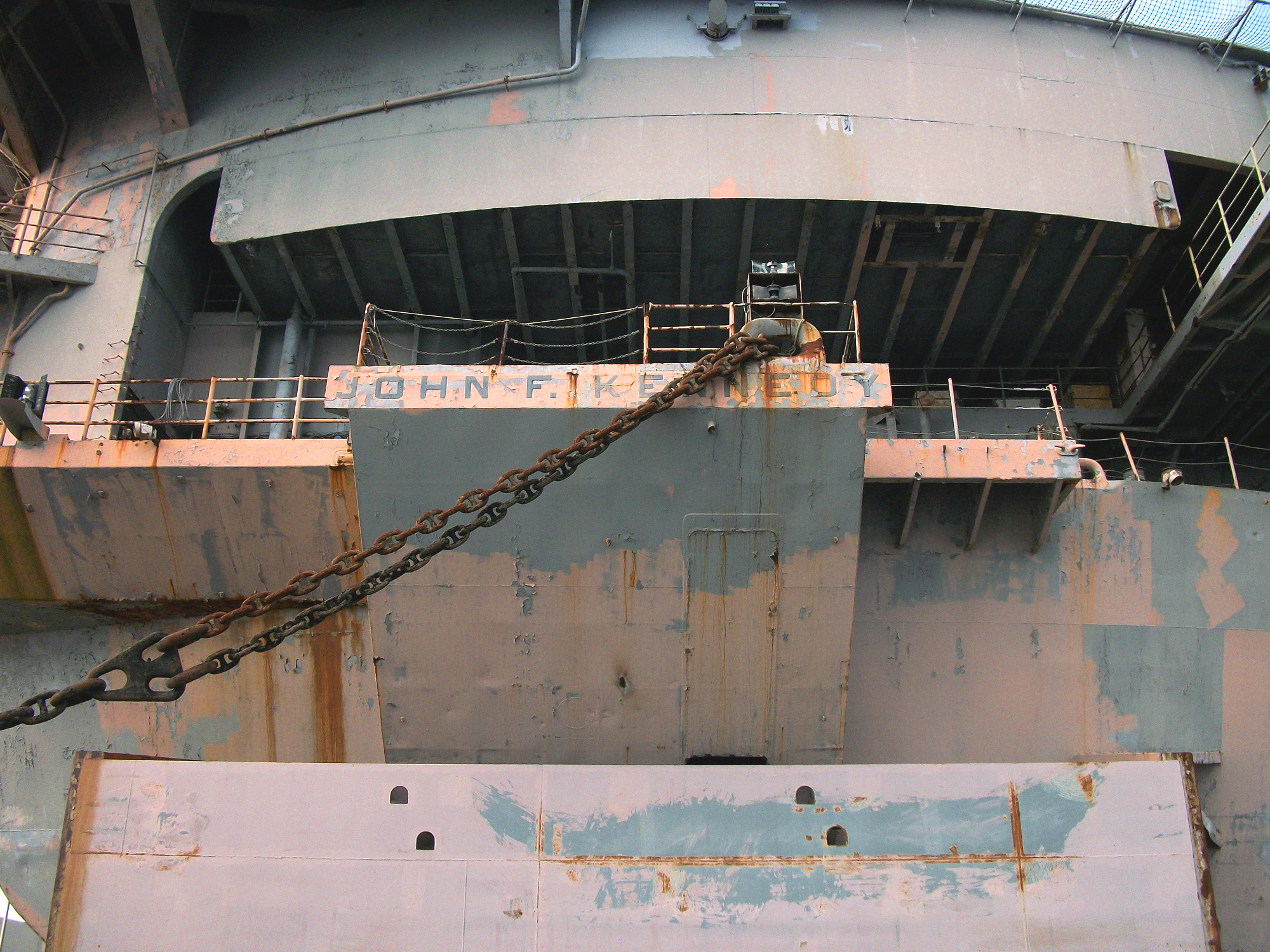
John F. Kennedy's stern, Naval Inactive Ship Maintenance Facility, Philadelphia Naval Shipyard, 2018

With the advent of the nuclear carrier, Kitty Hawk and John F. Kennedy were the last two candidate carriers to become museum ships as they have conventional propulsion. Nuclear carriers, such as Enterprise and the Nimitz class, require extensive deconstruction to remove their nuclear reactors during decommissioning, leaving them in an unsuitable condition for donation. In October 2017, it was announced that Kitty Hawk would be disposed of by scrapping, leaving John F. Kennedy the last available carrier capable of conversion to a museum.

In late 2017, the Navy revoked John F. Kennedy's "donation hold" status and designated her for dismantling. There were still several groups, from Florida, Maine and Rhode Island, with the assistance of the USS John F. Kennedy Veterans Association, hoping to persuade the Navy to reinstate the "donation hold" status, while they pursued the goal of obtaining her as a museum.

On 6 October 2021, John F. Kennedy and Kitty Hawk were sold for one cent each to International Shipbreaking Limited.

On 16 January 2025, John F. Kennedy started the voyage to Brownsville, Texas where it will be scrapped. The carrier arrived on 2 February.

== In popular culture ==
The TV series Supercarrier was partially filmed on board the ship between September and November 1987, while the ship was undergoing a period of upkeep

== See also ==
- List of memorials to John F. Kennedy
- Robert McNamara as Secretary of Defense § Naval aviation
