= ABS Steels =

Types of structural steel standardized for use in shipbuilding

ABS Steels are types of structural steel which are standardized by the American Bureau of Shipping for use in shipbuilding.

ABS steels include many grades in ordinary-strength and two levels of higher-strength specifications.

All of these steels have been engineered to be optimal long-lived shipbuilding steels. ABS does permit the use of other steels in shipbuilding, but discourages it, and requires more detailed engineering analysis.

== Basic properties ==
All ABS steels are standard carbon steels. As with other grades of steel, they have a specific gravity of 7.8.-

== Material Properties ==
ASTM A131 Material Properties, as Required by ABS for Steel Materials
ABS Grade	Tensile Strength (KSI)	Yield Point (KSI)	Min. 2" Elongation %
Grade A	58-75	34	22
Grade B	58-75	34	22
Grade D	58-75	34	22
Grade E	58-75	34	22
Grade AH32	64-85	46	20
Grade DH32	64-85	46	20
Grade EH32	64-85	46	20
Grade FH32	64-85	46	20
Grade AH36	71-90	51	20
Grade DH36	71-90	51	20
Grade EH36	71-90	51	20
Grade FH36	71-90	51	20

== Ordinary-Strength ==
Ordinary-strength ABS shipbuilding steel comes in a number of grades, A, B, D, E, DS, and CS. On certified steels, the plates are marked with the grade and a preceding "AB/", e.g. AB/A etc.

Yield point for all ordinary-strength ABS steels is specified as 34,000 psi (235 MPa), except for ABS A in thicknesses of greater than 1 inch (25 mm) which has yield strength of 32,000 psi (225 MPa), and cold flange rolled sections, which have yield strength of 30,000 psi (205 MPa).

Ultimate tensile strength of ordinary strength alloys is 58,000 - 71,000 psi (400-490 MPa), except for ABS A shapes and bars with 58,000 - 80,000 psi (400-550 MPa), and cold flanged sections with 55,000 - 65,000 psi (380-450 MPa).

The various grades have slightly differing alloy chemical ingredients, and differing fracture toughness.

== Higher-Strength ==
Higher-strength ABS shipbuilding steel comes in six grades of two strengths, AH32, DH32, EH32, AH36, DH36, and EH36.

The 32 grades have yield strength of 45,500 psi (315 MPa), and ultimate tensile strength of 64,000 - 85,000 psi (440-590 MPa).

The 36 grades have yield strength of 51,000 psi (355 MPa), and ultimate tensile strength of 71,000 - 90,000 psi (490-620 MPa).

Per Steel Vessel Rules Part 2 Chapter 1 Section 3 Table 2 (pg 36).

== Forms ==
ABS steel is produced in a variety of different forms, including:

- Plates
- Bars
- Pipes
- Structural Shapes
