= Burial Lake =

Lake in Alaska, United States

- Interactive map of Burial Lake
- Location: Noatak National Preserve, North Slope Borough, Alaska, U.S.
- Coordinates: 68°26′2″N 159°10′26″W
- Part of: Noatak River watershed
- Primary inflows: Ephemeral gullies
- Primary outflows: Unnamed stream
- Catchment area: 655 acres (2.65 km^{2})
- Surface area: 161 acres (0.65 km^{2})
- Max. depth: 79 ft (24 m)
- Surface elevation: 1,410 ft (430 m)

Burial Lake (Iñupiaq: Quaġaqat) is a small lake in the Brooks Range of northwestern Alaska, United States, within Noatak National Preserve. Draining to the Anisak River via an unnamed stream, the roughly circular lake sits on a slightly elevated region of tundra south of the De Long Mountains. A mesotrophic lake (with intermediate levels of nutrients and biological productivity), it hosts a population of lake trout, which feed off snails. A band of Nunamiut, a subgroup of the Iñupiat people, once maintained a fall and winter settlement at the lake. The English name stems from a nearby Nunamiut burial site.

Although large alpine glaciers and continental ice sheets covered much of the surrounding region during portions of the Last Glacial Period, Burial Lake is among very few Alaskan lakes to have persisted continuously throughout the period without being covered by ice or inudated by a larger proglacial lake. Core samples from the lakebed sediments allow the reconstruction of climate conditions in the region up to 38,000 years ago. Prior to the beginning of the Holocene around 12,000 years ago, the lake was within an eastern extension of the mammoth steppe in Beringia, a land bridge between North America and Siberia. Geochemical analysis of the sediment cores have shown an increased level of polycyclic aromatic hydrocarbons (a marker for human fire usage) and coprostanol (a biomarker for human fecal matter), suggesting a human presence in the region earlier than previously thought.

== Hydrology ==
Burial Lake measures 161 acres (65 ha) in surface area, with a maximum depth of 79 feet (24 m). The surface lies at an elevation of 1,410 feet (430 m) above sea level. Roughly circular, its drainage basin measures only 655 acres (265 ha), hemmed in by steep slopes 10 to 16 feet (3 to 5 m) high, which surround much of the lake's shoreline. Several gullies carry ephemeral streams as inflow from the north, while a small stream at the southwestern edge of the lake serves as an outlet. The lake is well-mixed, without evidence for thermal or chemical stratification.

The high and glaciated De Long Mountains, a northwestern extension of the Brooks Range, flank the northern margin of the drainage basin. To the southwest, across the Anisak River valley, are the somewhat lower Iggiruk Mountains. The lake sits on a slightly elevated region between Setting Sun Creek to the west and an unnamed stream to the east, both of which drain south into the Anisak River. The Anisak flows southeast to its confluence with the Noatak River, which drains into Hotham Inlet in the Chukchi Sea. Stretches of permafrost underlie the region at depths below 650 to 1,000 feet (200 to 300 m).

=== Biology and climate ===
Burial Lake is surrounded by tundra, dominated by sedges, Salix and Betula shrubs. The tree Populus balsamifera (balsam poplar) is found in limited quantities in nearby valleys. The nearest spruce forest lies along the Noatak River around 60 miles (100 km) to the west. The characteristic tundra climate of the region has long, cold winters and short, cool summers. The area is arid, receiving no more than 2 inches (50 mm) of precipitation during the wettest months. Average temperatures reach around 50 °F (10 °C) in the summer, falling to about −13 °F (−25 °C) in the winter. Measurements of the lake in August 1997 found a water temperature of 50.7 °F (10.4 °C) and a pH of 6.5. Dissolved oxygen levels were 7.7 mg per liter.

Lake trout live in Burial Lake, commonly feeding off snails, which themselves feed off periphyton. Surveys during the 2000s decade found the lake to be mesotrophic (intermediate levels of nutrients and biological productivity), as opposed to the lower oligotrophic conditions of a variety of other Alaskan Arctic lakes. These surveys found significantly elevated levels of phosphorus and mercury, the latter of which exceeded United States Environmental Protection Agency human safety regulations. Elevated levels of the insecticide dieldrin were also found in the lake.

== Geology ==
Mississippian-era sedimentary rocks such as limestone, shale, chert, and dolomite form the bedrock of the surrounding region. Poorly-sorted solifluction deposits, formed from the Late Pleistocene through the Holocene, are present to the north of the lake, beyond which lies an outcropping of silt-covered bedrock. The crest of a moraine runs to the east of the lake, consisting of poorly-sorted glacial till deposited during the Sagavanirktok glaciation of the Middle Pleistocene. Proglacial lake deposits dating to the Late Pleistocene Itkillik glaciation extend south and southwest from the lake towards layers of modern alluvium which surround the Anisak River and Setting Sun Creek. Alpine glaciers during this period blocked the Noatak River, forming a series of proglacial lakes up to 1,700 square miles (4,400 km^{2}) in area, collectively known as Glacial Lake Noatak. Lake Noatak likely did not reach the headwaters of the Anisak nor cover Burial Lake. Burial Lake lies just beyond the apparent maximum extents of both alpine glaciers and continental ice sheets across the Last Glacial Maximum (LGM), from around 26,000 to 18,000 years ago.

=== Paleoenvironment ===
Burial Lake is among very few Arctic Alaskan lakes which persisted throughout the LGM. This allows for the most extensive lake sediment records in eastern Beringia—the now partially-submerged region which connected Siberia and North America during the Last Glacial Period. This has allowed for reconstruction of the region's paleoenviroment and climate from analysis of core samples. Sediment cores were taken from the lake in 1998 and 2020 (the latter from its deepest point). Sediment records from marine isotope stage 3 (from roughly 40,000 to 29,000 years ago), an interstadial period preceding the LGM, are scarce and somewhat conflicting in the Alaskan Arctic.

Almost 40 species of the fly family Chironomidae (the non-biting midges) were found in core samples taken from the lake. The distribution of these taxa across different layers of sediment have been used to reconstruct the temperature of the surrounding area during and after the Pleistocene glaciations. The samples suggest that average July air temperatures rose from 45.5 °F (7.5 °C) around 38,000 years ago to 48 °F (9 °C) around 37,600 years ago, the highest temperature recorded prior to the end of the LGM. Air temperatures declined and stabilized after 25,000 years ago, during the LGM. They increased again around 17,000 years ago, accompanied by a rapid change of vegetation attested by changes in pollen deposits. The early Holocene thermal maximum was reached around 12,300 years ago, resulting in July air temperatures slightly above modern averages. A 2025 study found that organic carbon release from ancient permafrost decreased in the warmer temperatures which followed the LGM, possibly due to the greater amount of vegetation in the area acting as an insulator.

Analysis of biogenic silica levels in sediment cores—a marker for diatom activity—have been used to reconstruct climate fluctuations in the area during the Holocene, including moisture levels and the yearly timespan for which the lake was covered by ice. Analysis of plant material suggests the lake reached stable levels of organic productivity around 9,400 years ago, around the time which Alnus shrubs are first attested in the region. Alnus shrubs and Sphagnum mosses are common in sediments following this point, suggesting a continued moist tundra climate. Organic productivity rose sharply around 5500 years ago, alongside a shift towards warmer summer temperatures in central Alaska. The Neoglaciation of the late Holocene resulted in periods of reduced diatom levels around 3500 years and 2500 years ago, as well as over the past 500 years during the Little Ice Age.

==== Archaeological significance ====
Geochemical analysis of the lake's sediment show increased levels of both polycyclic aromatic hydrocarbons (PAHs, a marker for human fire usage) from 34,000 to 16,000 years ago, in comparison to present levels. The ratio of coprostanol (a biomarker for human fecal matter) to stigmastanol (a similar fecal biomarker for herbivore animals) in the sediment is also significantly higher than the expected background level during this time. Although PAHs are released by natural wildfires, the colder climates of the period generally lower wildfire activity. During this period, much of Beringia was covered by mammoth steppe, a vast biome which supported animals such as woolly mammoths, bison, caribou, muskoxen, horses, and woolly rhinoceroses.

Alongside similar sediment data from the Lake E5 north of the Brooks range and controversial evidence from the Bluefish Caves site in the Yukon, this data suggests human presence in eastern Beringia for millennia prior to 23,000 years ago, the estimated date of genetic isolation between ancient East Asians and the ancestors of modern Native Americans. The Beringian Standstill Hypothesis suggests that a human population resided in Beringia during this period before dispersing across North America, likely concentrated along the now-underwater Bering Land Bridge.

== Human history ==
The Nunamiut, an inland subgroup of the Iñupiat people, named the lake Quaġaqat for the plant sourdock, which was foraged in the area. A Nunamiut fall and winter settlement of two houses was located along the western shore of the lake, initially occupied around the 17th or 18th centuries. This site was used by groups of Nunamiut who summered further inland. United States Geological Survey research I. L. Tailleur gave the lake its English name in 1951, naming it after a nearby Iñupiaq burial site. The lake lies within Noatak National Preserve, a federally protected area established in 1978.
