= Lake E5 =

Lake in Alaska

- Oil Lake
- Interactive map of Lake E5
- Location: North Slope Borough, Alaska, U.S.
- Coordinates: 68°38′33″N 149°27′30″W
- Primary outflows: Unnamed stream, ultimately to Kuparuk River
- Catchment area: 320 acres (1.3 km^{2})
- Surface area: 24 acres (0.097 km^{2})
- Max. depth: 42 ft (13 m)
- Surface elevation: 2,608 ft (795 m)

Lake E5, also known as Oil Lake, is a small lake in northern Alaska, United States, located just south of the Dalton Highway in the northeastern foothills of the Brooks Range. Biomarkers within sediment deposits found at the lake have indicated the presence of humans in the region since at least 32,000 years ago. However, no archaeological remains have been found in the area.

== Hydrology ==
Lake E5 is a small lake in the North Slope Borough, Alaska, about 325 feet (100 m) south of the Dalton Highway in the foothills of the Brooks Range. It has a surface area of around 24 acres (0.1 km^{2}), measuring 2,130 feet (650 m) long at its longest, and 1,020 feet (310 m) at its widest. With a surface elevation of about 2,608 feet (795 m) above sea level, its maximum depth is 42 feet (10 m). Its drainage basin covers approximately 320 acres (1.3 km^{2}), encompassing a region of rolling hills mostly to the southwest of the lake, plus two seasonal streams to the south and southwest. It is drained by a small outlet on the northern tip of the lake to the Kuparuk River to the northeast.

The surrounding region is carpeted in tussock-covered tundra, with erratic boulders on a ridge southwest of the lake protruding from the vegetation. The Trans-Alaska Pipeline runs just to the south of the lake.

== Geology and paleoclimate ==
The lake sits on a moraine formed during the advance of the Sagavanirktok River Glaciation, dating to the Middle Pleistocene. Slightly west of the lake are deposits from the younger Itkillik Glaciation dating to the Late Pleistocene. Although it has likely received infill since the Middle Pleistocene, reducing its size, it has not dried completely, thus forming a continuous history of sediment layers during this time.

Fecal biomarkers and evidence of increased fire prevalence from the lake's sediment record suggest the presence of humans in the surrounding region since at least 32,000 years ago. Alongside similar sediment data from Burial Lake, and controversial evidence from the Bluefish Caves site in the Yukon, these data suggest human presence in eastern Beringia for millennia prior to 23,000 years ago, which is the estimated date of genetic isolation between ancient East Asians and the ancestors of modern Native Americans. The Beringian Standstill Hypothesis suggests that a human population resided in Beringia during this period before dispersing across North America, likely concentrated along the now-underwater Bering Land Bridge.

A 2022 archaeological survey performed reconnaissance and dug test pits around the Lake E5 basin, but did not find any signs of prehistoric human habitation in the area. Evidence elsewhere in the northeastern Brooks Range attests human presence for approximately the past 12,000 years.
