= C27H48 =

The molecular formula C_{27}H_{48} (molar mass: 372.67 g/mol, exact mass: 372.3756 u) may refer to:

- Cholestane
- Coprostane, or 5β-cholestane
- 1,3,5-Triheptylbenzene, also called sym-triheptylbenzene
