= Jacques Cinq-Mars =

Canadian archaeologist

Jacques Cinq-Mars (1942 — 28 November 2021, aged 79) was a Canadian archaeologist specializing in Canada, especially Yukon. He is known for unsuccessfully challenging the Clovis First hypothesis in the 1980s. Only after his death were his challenges vindicated.

== Career ==
Jacques Cinq-Mars began working in the Yukon in 1966, as a doctoral student taking part in excavations of Bill Irving at the late prehistoric village of Klo-kut. The subject of his doctoral thesis were Yellow Lake and the Tertiary Hills clinker sources. But even though he completed his PhD dissertation, it was never brought forward for defence.

In 1975, Cinq-Mars and Irving securing funding for the 5-year Northern Yukon Research Program (NYRP), of which Cinq-Mars was associate director and co-principal investigator of until 1975. During this time he was also part-time lecturer at the University of Toronto.

=== Bluefish Caves ===
During a helicopter survey in 1975, the team of the NYRP discovered the Bluefish Caves. Cinq-Mars would excavate them from 1977 to 1979, and discover evidence of very ancient human presence.

In 1979, Cinq-Mars accepted the positions of Head of the Rescue Archaeology Programme and Curator of Boreal Forest Archaeology at the Canadian Museum of Civilization (CMC). He continuing research at Bluefish Caves, now under the auspices of the CMC. The same year the Canadian Journal of Archaeology published a paper of his, in which he concluded that the deposits at Bluefish Caves I were approximately 10 to 13 thousand years old, and that they included cultural evidence dating to that time period.

In 1982, Richard E. Morland and Jacques Cinq-Mars postulated that the Yukon territories were already populated during "the most severe period of glaciation in North America", challenging the Clovis First hypothesis that was prevalent in the archaeological community at the time. They argued that a caribou tibia found by Harington in 1966, which had been radiocarbon dated to c. 27,000 years BP, was a "fleshing tool with delicate denticulations on the working end" and that "such workmanship could only have been accomplished while the bone was fresh". They also referenced two other mammoth bone fragments that "had been broken and flaked while fresh", which were dated to around the same age. Furthermore, they interpreted cuts on Old Crow fossils as butchering marks from stone tools, and suggested many other stones and bones from the Pleistocene found at the site were flaked.

Their interpretations failed to gain widespread acceptance until decades later. For instance, in a 1993 article Hoffecker, Powers and Goebel argued that the breakage was of "non-human origin (probably carnivore)", and that the dates "obtained from the bones, the relation between the bones and artifacts remains unclear and the age of the latter has yet to be established."

The CMC stopped funding excavations at Bluefish Caves in 1987, due to the acrimonious debate surrounding the date and Cinq-Mars' interpretations. However, he remained employed at the CMC and continued to be involved in research in the Yukon.

=== Later career ===
From the mid-1980s to the mid-1990s, Cinq-Mars coordinated research and inventories at several sites for the Northern Oil and Gas Action Plan Archaeology Project (NOGAP).

In 1991, Cinq-Mars was transferred to the position of Curator at Quebec Archaeology.

In 1996, he was expanding survey in the Richardson Mountain foothills and east of the Crow Flats.

The government of Yukon developed a new interpretive centre starting in 1996, which focused on the Beringian history of the Yukon and the important research that was done in the territory. Cinq-Mars' research was featured prominently and he became a major contributor to the exhibits displayed at the centre.

In 2002, Cinq-Mar retired from the Canadian Museum of Civilization, but continued to publish until 2008.

== Personal life ==
He is survived by his widow Andrée Favre, and his two sons, Marc and Eric Cinq-Mars and five grandchildren.

Both his father and grandfather were great artists.

In the early 2002s he started constructing replicas of traditional wooden boats.

== Selected publications ==
- Cinq-Mars, Jacques. 1979. "Bluefish Cave I: A Late Pleistocene Western Beringian Cave Deposit in the Northern Yukon," Canadian Journal of Archaeology 3: 1–32.
- Morlan, Richard E., and Jacques Cinq-Mars. 1983. "Ancient Beringians: Human Occupations in the Late Pleistocene of Alaska and the Yukon Territory," pp. 53–382 in The Paleoecology of Beringia, edited by D. M. Hopkins, J. V. Mathews, C. E. Schweger, and S. B. Young. Academic Press: New York.
- Cinq-Mars J. and Morlan RE. 1999. "Bluefish Caves and Old Crow Basin: A New Rapport," pp. 200–212 in Ice Age Peoples of North America Environments, Origins, and Adaptations of the First Americans, edited by R. Bonnichsen and K. L. Turnmire. Center for the Study of the First Americans. Oregon State University Press.
