= Kuparuk =

Kuparuk may refer to:

- Kuparuk Oil Field, in North Slope Borough, Alaska, United States
- Kuparuk River, in North Slope Borough, Alaska, United States
