= Emopamil =

Names
- IUPAC name 2-isopropyl-5-(methyl- (2-phenylethyl)amino)- 2-phenylpentanenitrile

Identifiers
CAS Number	78370-13-5
3D model (JSmol)	Interactive image; Interactive image
ChEMBL	ChEMBL173809
ChemSpider	64360
KEGG	C13766
PubChem CID	71225
UNII	M514041RF7
CompTox Dashboard (EPA)	DTXSID90868474
- InChI: InChI=1S/C23H30N2/c1-20(2)23(19-24,22-13-8-5-9-14-22)16-10-17-25(3)18-15-21-11-6-4-7-12-21/h4-9,11-14,20H,10,15-18H2,1-3H3 Key: DWAWDSVKAUWFHC-UHFFFAOYSA-N; InChI=1/C23H30N2/c1-20(2)23(19-24,22-13-8-5-9-14-22)16-10-17-25(3)18-15-21-11-6-4-7-12-21/h4-9,11-14,20H,10,15-18H2,1-3H3 Key: DWAWDSVKAUWFHC-UHFFFAOYAK
- SMILES: N#CC(c1ccccc1)(C(C)C)CCCN(CCc2ccccc2)C; CC(C)C(CCCN(C)CCC1=CC=CC=C1)(C#N)C2=CC=CC=C2

Properties
Chemical formula	C_{23}H_{30}N_{2}
Molar mass	334.50 g/mol
- Except where otherwise noted, data are given for materials in their standard state (at 25 °C [77 °F], 100 kPa). verify (what is ?) Infobox references

Emopamil is a calcium channel blocker and a high affinity ligand of human sterol isomerase.

== Structure ==
Emopamil's structure consists of an organic amino compound, nitrile compound and a member of two benzene rings.

== Applications ==
Emopamil also known as EMP is a phenylalkylamine and inhibitor of 5-hydroxytryptamine 5-HT2 receptors. EMP includes a chiral quaternary carbon center, and research has indicated that its optical isomers have different biological effects. It interacts in an extracellular site of the nerve cell to inhibit calcium channel responses while other phenylalkylamines act at an intracellular site. The interaction site of emopamil suggests to its greater neuroprotective efficacy in research related to ischaemia.

== See also ==
- EBP (gene)
- Voltage-dependent calcium channels
- Verapamil
