= C29H52O =

The molecular formula C_{29}H_{52}O (molar mass: 416.72 g/mol, exact mass: 416.4018 u) may refer to:

- 24-Ethyl coprostanol
- Stigmastanol (sitostanol)
- Poriferastanol
