= Little John (archeological site) =

- location in Canada
- 62°30′51″N 140°55′29″W
- Location: near the White River First Nation community, Beaver Creek
- Region: Yukon, Canada

History
- Built: 14,050-13,720 BP

Site notes
- Archaeologists: Norman Alexander Easton

Little John is an archaeological site in Yukon, Canada, located 25 km (16 mi) northwest of the White River First Nation community of Beaver Creek, from which human artefacts and ancient animal bones have been radiocarbon dated to 14,000 years before present (BP), earlier than the generally accepted time for human migration into the Americas and one of the oldest sites in Beringia.

== Context ==
The Little John site lies at the edge of the Mirror Creek glacial advance (central Yukon's Reid, or North American Illinoian glacial events).

== Dating ==
The site was excavated by anthropologist Norman Alexander Easton between 2002 and 2017. Radiocarbon dating of one of the human butchered bison bones indicates that the site is between 13,720 and 14,050 years old.

== See also ==
- Bluefish Caves
- Beringia
- Old Crow Flats
- Pendejo Cave
