= Cholestenol =

Cholestenol refers to any sterol compound that differs from cholestane by the addition of a double bond and an alcohol group. By the definition of sterols, the alcohol group appears at the C-3 position; the position of the double bond is not fixed.

- Allocholesterol is Δ-4-Cholestenol.
- Cholesterol is Δ5-cholestenol.
  - Epicholesterol is an epimer, 3α-Cholesterol.
- Lathosterol is Δ7-cholestenol. It has been found in the skins of rats. It can be converted to cholesterol in mammals.
- Zymostenol is Δ-8-Cholestenol.

== See also ==
- C27H46O
