= Emopamil binding protein =

Protein-coding gene in humans

EBP
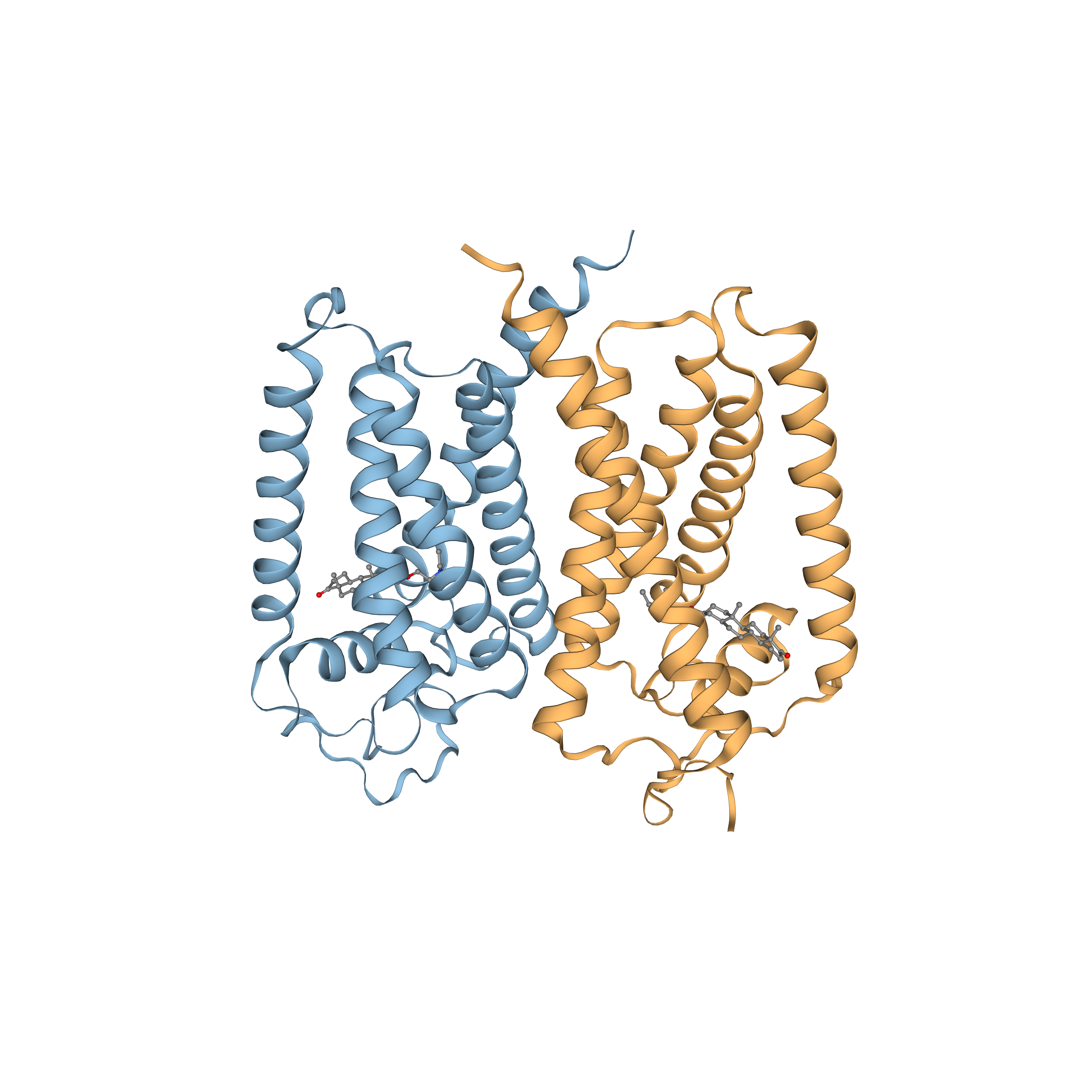

Identifiers
- Aliases: EBP, CDPX2, CHO2, CPX, CPXD, MEND, emopamil binding protein (sterol isomerase), cholestenol delta-isomerase, EBP cholestenol delta-isomerase
- External IDs: OMIM: 300205; MGI: 107822; GeneCards: EBP
Enzyme activity
EC #	BRENDA	ExPASy	KEGG	MetaCyc
3.3.2.11	↗	↗	↗	↗
5.3.3.5	↗	↗	↗	↗

Gene location (Human)
Chr.	X chromosome (human)
Band	Xp11.23	Start	48,521,799 bp
Band	Xp11.23	End	48,528,716 bp

Gene location (Mouse)
Chr.	X chromosome (mouse)
Band	X A1.1|X 3.7 cM	Start	8,051,568 bp
Band	X A1.1|X 3.7 cM	End	8,059,751 bp
RNA expression pattern
Bgee	Human / Mouse (ortholog); Top expressed in: right lobe of liver; right adrenal gland; right adrenal cortex; left adrenal gland; mucosa of transverse colon; left adrenal cortex; tendon of biceps brachii; oocyte; gingival epithelium; buccal mucosa cell / Top expressed in: left lobe of liver; esophagus; decidua; duodenum; jejunum; right kidney; proximal tubule; human kidney; left colon; pyloric antrum; More reference expression data
BioGPS	n/a
Gene ontology
Molecular function	C-8 sterol isomerase activity; isomerase activity; xenobiotic transmembrane transporter activity; transmembrane signaling receptor activity; cholestenol delta-isomerase activity; steroid delta-isomerase activity; protein binding
Cellular component	integral component of membrane; endoplasmic reticulum membrane; membrane; intracellular membrane-bounded organelle; integral component of plasma membrane; endoplasmic reticulum; cytoplasmic vesicle; nuclear envelope; nucleus
Biological process	skeletal system development; steroid metabolic process; sterol biosynthetic process; lipid metabolism; cholesterol metabolic process; cholesterol biosynthetic process via lathosterol; sterol metabolic process; cholesterol biosynthetic process via desmosterol; steroid biosynthetic process; cholesterol biosynthetic process; xenobiotic transmembrane transport; signal transduction; hemopoiesis; xenobiotic transport
Sources:Amigo / QuickGO
Orthologs
Databases	NCBI: entry; OMA: entry
Species	Human	Mouse
Entrez	10682	13595
Ensembl	ENSG00000147155	ENSMUSG00000031168
UniProt	Q15125	P70245
RefSeq (mRNA)	NM_006579	NM_007898
RefSeq (protein)	NP_006570	NP_031924
Location (UCSC)	Chr X: 48.52 – 48.53 Mb	Chr X: 8.05 – 8.06 Mb
PubMed search
- Wikidata
View/Edit Human	View/Edit Mouse

3-beta-hydroxysteroid-Δ8,Δ7-isomerase

Identifiers
- EC no.: 5.3.3.5

Databases
- BRENDA: enzyme data
- ExPASy: NiceZyme view
- KEGG: enzyme entry
- MetaCyc: metabolic pathway
- Rhea: reactions
- PDB structures: RCSB PDB PDBe PDBsum
- Gene Ontology: AmiGO / QuickGO
Search
- PMC: articles
- PubMed: articles
- NCBI: proteins

Emopamil binding protein is a protein that in humans is encoded by the EBP gene, located on the X chromosome. EBP was discovered through its high-affinity binding to anti-ischemic drugs such as emopamil, from which it also derives its name. In addition to emopamil, EBP also bind with high affinity a variety of structurally unrelated compounds, such as amiodarone, opipramol, ifenprodil, trifluoperazine, and chlorpromazine. EBP has a mass of 27.3 kDa and resembles the σ_{2}-receptor that resides in the endoplasmic reticulum of various tissues as an integral membrane protein.

== Function ==
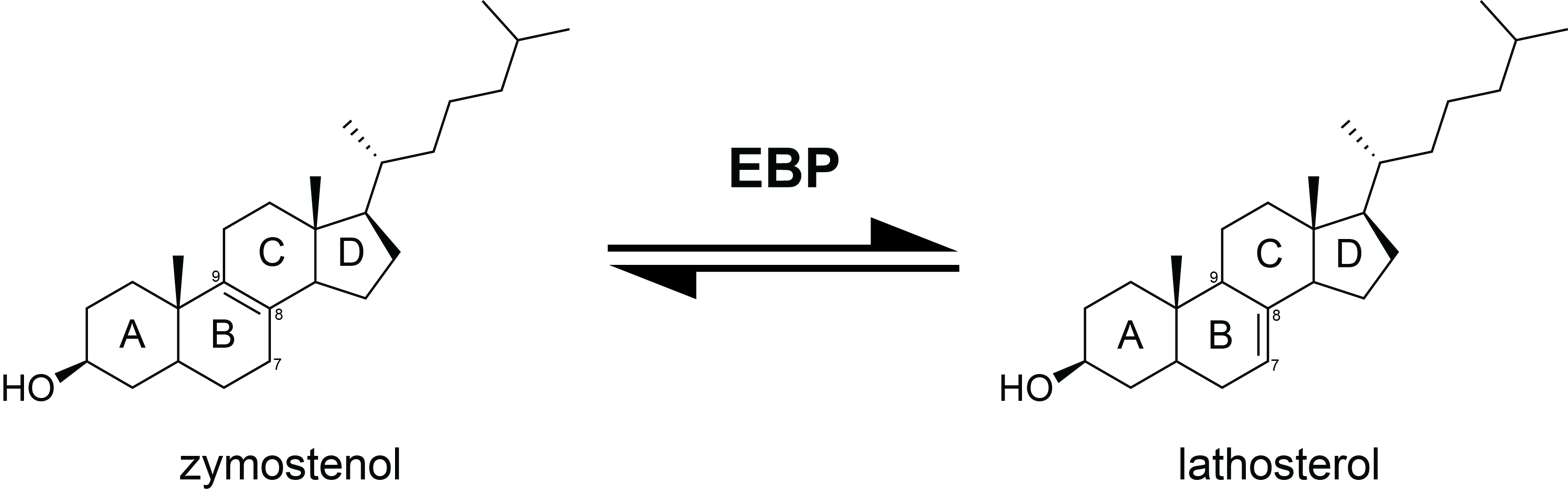
EBP functions as a Δ8–Δ7 sterol isomerase, catalyzing the migration of the double bond in the sterol B-ring from the 8(9) to the 7(8) position. In the Bloch pathway of cholesterol biosynthesis, EBP converts zymosterol to dehydrolathosterol, while in the Kandutsch–Russell pathway it converts zymostenol to lathosterol.

== Clinical significance ==
Mutations in EBP cause Conradi–Hünermann syndrome and impairs cholesterol biosynthesis. Unborn males affected with EBP mutations are not expected to be liveborn, (with up to only 5% male births). Individuals, mostly female, that are liveborn with EBP mutations experience stunted growth, limb reduction and back problems. Later in life, the individual may develop cataracts along with coarse hair and hair loss.

== Research areas ==
=== Remyelination and MS ===
The inhibition of EBP promotes oligodendrocyte formation, which may help remyelination and thus limit multiple sclerosis development.

=== Cloning ===
Isolation, replication and characterization of the EBP and EBP-like protein have been performed in yeast/E. Coli strains (which lack the EBP protein in nature) to study the high-affinity drug binding effects.

== See also ==
- Emopamil
- Cholestenol Delta-isomerase
- Sigma-1 receptor
- Sigma-2 receptor
