= C27H46O =

The molecular formula C_{27}H_{46}O (molar mass: 386.65 g/mol, exact mass: 386.354866) may refer to:

- Cholestenol
  - Allocholesterol (Δ-4-Cholestenol) CAS#517-10-2
  - Cholesterol (Δ-5-Cholestenol) CAS#57-88-5
  - Epicholesterol (3α-Cholesterol) CAS#474-77-1
  - Lathosterol (Δ-7-Cholestenol) CAS#80-99-9
  - Zymostenol (Δ-8-Cholestenol) CAS#566-97-2
- Coprostanone CAS#601-53-6
- i-cholesterol CAS#465-54-3
- Dihydrotachysterol 3 CAS#22481-38-5
