= Coprostanol =

Biomarker for human faecal matter

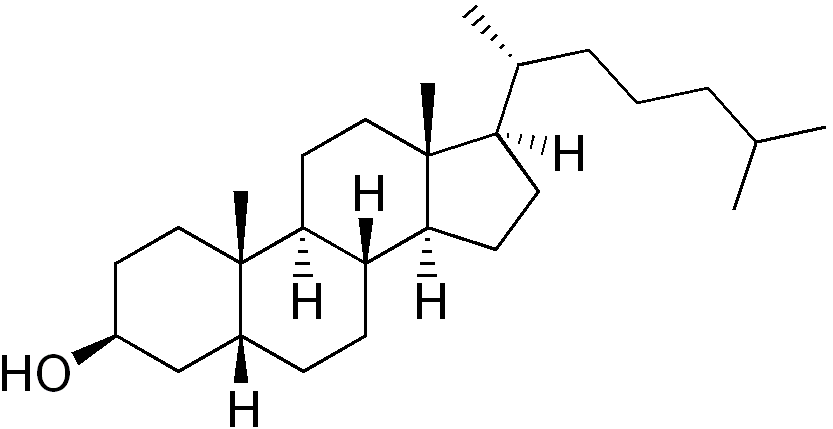

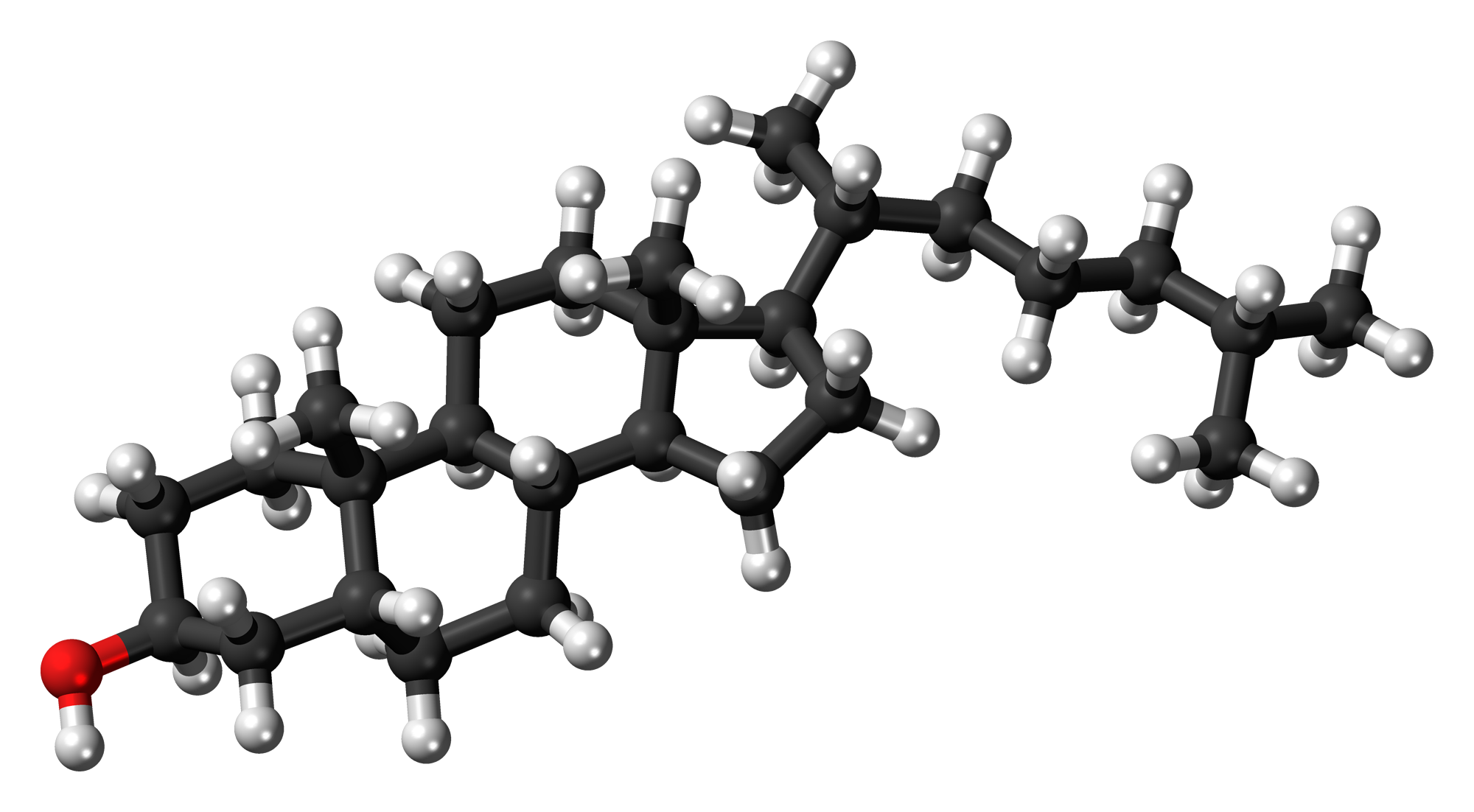

Names
- IUPAC name 5β-cholestan-3β-ol
- Other names 5β-coprostanol coprostanol

Identifiers
CAS Number	360-68-9
3D model (JSmol)	Interactive image
ChEBI	CHEBI:89519
ChEMBL	ChEMBL2048325
ChemSpider	191826
ECHA InfoCard	100.006.036
EC Number	206-638-8
PubChem CID	221122
UNII	PPT67I3S74
CompTox Dashboard (EPA)	DTXSID1052036
- InChI: InChI=1S/C27H48O/c1-18(2)7-6-8-19(3)23-11-12-24-22-10-9-20-17-21(28)13-15-26(20,4)25(22)14-16-27(23,24)5/h18-25,28H,6-17H2,1-5H3/t19-,20-,21+,22+,23-,24+,25+,26+,27-/m1/s1 Key: QYIXCDOBOSTCEI-NWKZBHTNSA-N; InChI=1/C27H48O/c1-18(2)7-6-8-19(3)23-11-12-24-22-10-9-20-17-21(28)13-15-26(20,4)25(22)14-16-27(23,24)5/h18-25,28H,6-17H2,1-5H3/t19-,20-,21+,22+,23-,24+,25+,26+,27-/m1/s1 Key: QYIXCDOBOSTCEI-NWKZBHTNBU
- SMILES: O[C@H]4CC[C@]3([C@H](CC[C@H]2[C@@H]1CC[C@@H]([C@@]1(C)CC[C@@H]23)[C@H](C)CCCC(C)C)C4)C

Properties
Chemical formula	C_{27}H_{48}O
Molar mass	388.680 g·mol^{−1}
Melting point	102 °C (216 °F; 375 K)
Solubility in water	Poorly soluble

Hazards
Flash point	Non-flammable

Related compounds
Related Stanols	24-ethyl coprostanol 5α-cholestanol epi-coprostanol
- Except where otherwise noted, data are given for materials in their standard state (at 25 °C [77 °F], 100 kPa). verify (what is ?) Infobox references

5β-Coprostanol (5β-cholestan-3β-ol) is a 27-carbon stanol formed from the net reductive metabolism of cholesterol (cholest-5en-3β-ol) in the gut of most mammals and birds. This compound has frequently been used as a biomarker for the presence of human faecal matter in the environment. 5β-coprostanol is thought to be exclusively bacterial in origin.

== Chemical properties ==
=== Solubility ===
5β-coprostanol has a low water solubility, and consequently a high octanol-water partition coefficient (log K_{ow} = 8.82). In other words, 5β-coprostanol has an affinity nearly 1 billion times higher for octanol than for water. This means that in most environmental systems, 5β-coprostanol will be associated with the solid phase.

=== Degradation ===
In anaerobic sediments and soils, 5β-coprostanol is stable for many hundreds of years enabling it to be used as an indicator of past faecal discharges. As such, records of 5β-coprostanol from paleo-environmental archives have been used to further constrain the timing of human settlements in a region, as well as reconstruct relative changes in human populations and agricultural activities over several thousand years.

=== Chemical analysis ===
Since the molecule has a hydroxyl (-OH) group, it is frequently bound to other lipids including fatty acids; most analytical methods, therefore, utilise a strong alkali (KOH or NaOH) to saponify the ester linkages. Typical extraction solvents include 6% KOH in methanol. The free sterols and stanols (saturated sterols) are then separated from the polar lipids by partitioning into a less polar solvent such as hexane. Prior to analysis, the hydroxyl group is frequently derivatised with BSTFA (bis-trimethyl silyl trifluoroacetamide) to replace the hydrogen with the less exchangeable trimethylsilyl (TMS) group. Instrumental analysis is frequently conducted on gas chromatograph (GC) with either a flame ionisation detector (FID) or mass spectrometer (MS). The mass spectrum for 5β-coprostanol - TMS ether can be seen in the figure. Alternatively, liquid-chromatography mass spectrometry (LC-MS) techniques that employ atmospheric pressure chemical ionization (APCI) may also be employed to detect coprostanol under positive mode.

=== Isomers ===
As well as the faecally derived stanol, two other isomers can be identified in the environment; 5α-cholestanol

== Formation and occurrence ==
=== Faecal sources ===
5β-coprostanol is formed by the conversion of cholesterol to coprostanol in the gut of most higher animals by intestinal bacteria. It is generally accepted that the metabolism of cholesterol to coprostanol by gut bacteria proceeds in an indirect manner via ketone intermediates, rather than direct reduction of the Δ^{5,6} double bond. be seen in the figure proposed by Grimalt et al., (1990).

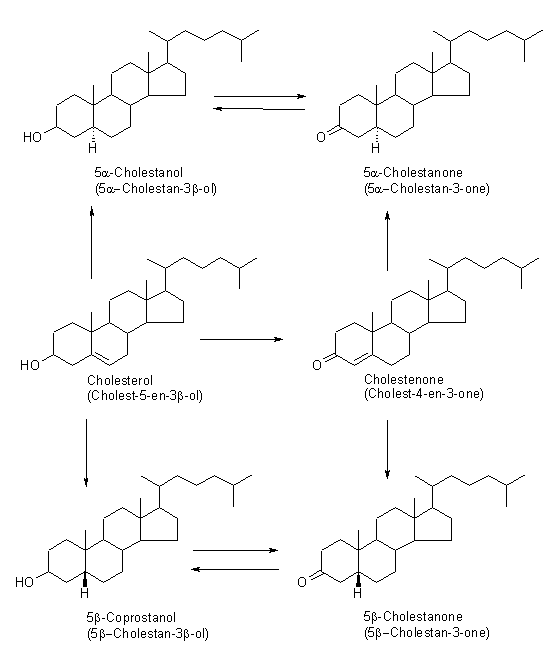

List of animals in which 5β-coprostanol has been identified in faecal matter.
Animals producing coprostanol	Animals NOT producing coprostanol
Humans	Dogs
Cattle	?
Sheep	?
Birds	?

There are a small number of animals, however, that have been shown not to produce 5β-coprostanol and these can be seen in the table.

== Use as a tracer for sewage ==
The principal source of 5β-coprostanol in the environment is from human wastes. The concentration of 5β-coprostanol in raw, untreated sewage is around 2–6% of the dry solids. This relatively high concentration and its stability allows it to be used in the assessment of the faecal matter in samples, especially sediments.

=== 5β-coprostanol / cholesterol ratio ===
Since 5β-coprostanol is formed from cholesterol in the vertebrate gut, the ratio of the product over reactant can be used to indicate the degree of faecal matter in samples. Raw untreated sewage typically has a 5β-coprostanol / cholesterol ratio of ~10 which decreases through a sewage treatment plant (STP) such that in the discharged liquid wastewaters the ratio is ~2. Undiluted STP wastewaters may be identified by this high ratio. As the faecal matter is dispersed in the environment, the ratio will decrease as more (non-faecal) cholesterol from animals is encountered. Grimalt & Albaiges (year?) have suggested that samples with a 5β-coprostanol / cholesterol greater than 0.2 may be considered as contaminated by faecal material.

=== 5β-coprostanol / (5β-coprostanol + 5α-cholestanol) ratio ===
Another measure of human faecal contamination is the proportion of the two 3β-ol isomers of the saturated sterol form. 5α-cholestanol is formed naturally in the environment by bacteria and generally does not have a faecal origin. Samples with ratios greater than 0.7 may be contaminated with human faecal matter; samples with values less than 0.3 may be considered uncontaminated. Samples with ratios between these two cut-offs can not readily be categorised on the basis of this ratio alone.

Sediments falling in the red region are classed as “contaminated” by both of the two ratios and those in the green region are classified as “uncontaminated” by the same measures. Those in the blue region are “uncontaminated” according to the 5β-coprostanol / cholesterol ratio and “uncertain” in the 5β-coprostanol / (5β-coprostanol + 5α-cholestanol) ratio. The majority of the samples between the 0.3 and 0.7 cut-offs are considered as “uncontaminated” according to the 5β-coprostanol / cholesterol ratio and so the 0.3 value must be considered as somewhat conservative.

=== 5β-coprostanol / total sterols ratio ===
Cut-off values etc.

=== 5β-coprostanol / 24-ethyl coprostanol ===
Herbivores such as cows and sheep consume terrestrial plant matter (grass) which contains β-sitosterol as the principal sterol. β-sitosterol is the 24-ethyl derivative of cholesterol and can be used as a biomarker for terrestrial plant matter (see section). In the gut of these animals, bacteria biohydrogenate the double bond in the 5 position to create 24-ethyl coprostanol and so this compound can be used as a biomarker for faecal matter from herbivores. Typical values in different source materials can be seen in the table after Gilpin (year?).

Source	5β-cop / 24-ethyl cop
Septic tanks	2.9 – 3.7
Community wastewater	2.6 – 4.1
Abattoir – sheep, cattle	0.5 – 0.9
Dairy shed wash-down	0.2

=== Epi-coprostanol / 5β-coprostanol ===
During sewage treatment, 5β-coprostanol may be converted to 5β-cholestan-3α-ol form, epi-coprostanol. There is also a slow conversion of 5β-coprostanol to epi-coprostanol in the environment and so this ratio will indicate either the degree of treatment of sewage or its age in the environment. A cross-plot of the 5β-coprostanol / cholesterol ratio with the epi-coprostanol / 5β-coprostanol can indicate both faecal contamination and treatment.

== Related markers ==
=== 5α-cholestanol / cholesterol ===
In the environment, bacteria preferentially produce 5α-cholestan-3β-ol (5α-cholestanol) from cholesterol rather than the 5β isomer. This reaction occurs principally in anaerobic reducing sediments and the 5α-cholestanol / cholesterol ratio may be used as a secondary (process) biomarker for such conditions. No cut-off values have been suggested for this marker and so it is used in a relative sense; the greater the ratio, the more reducing the environment. Reducing environments are frequently associated with areas experiencing high organic matter input; this may include sewage derived discharges. The relationship between reducing conditions and the potential source can be seen in a cross plot with a sewage indicator.
It may be suggested from this relationship that sewage discharges are in part responsible for the anaerobic reducing conditions in the sediments.

== Use in archaeological studies ==
Coprostanol and its derivative epicoprostanol are used in archaeological and paleoenvironmental studies as indicators of past human activity due to their longevity in soils and strong association with production in the human gut. Researchers have used the presence of coprostanol to identify archaeological features such as cesspits or landscape activities like manuring. Variations in the concentration of coprostanol over time can be used to create human population reconstructions within a specific depositional environment.

== See also ==
- Coprostane
