= Coprostane =

Steroid chemical compound

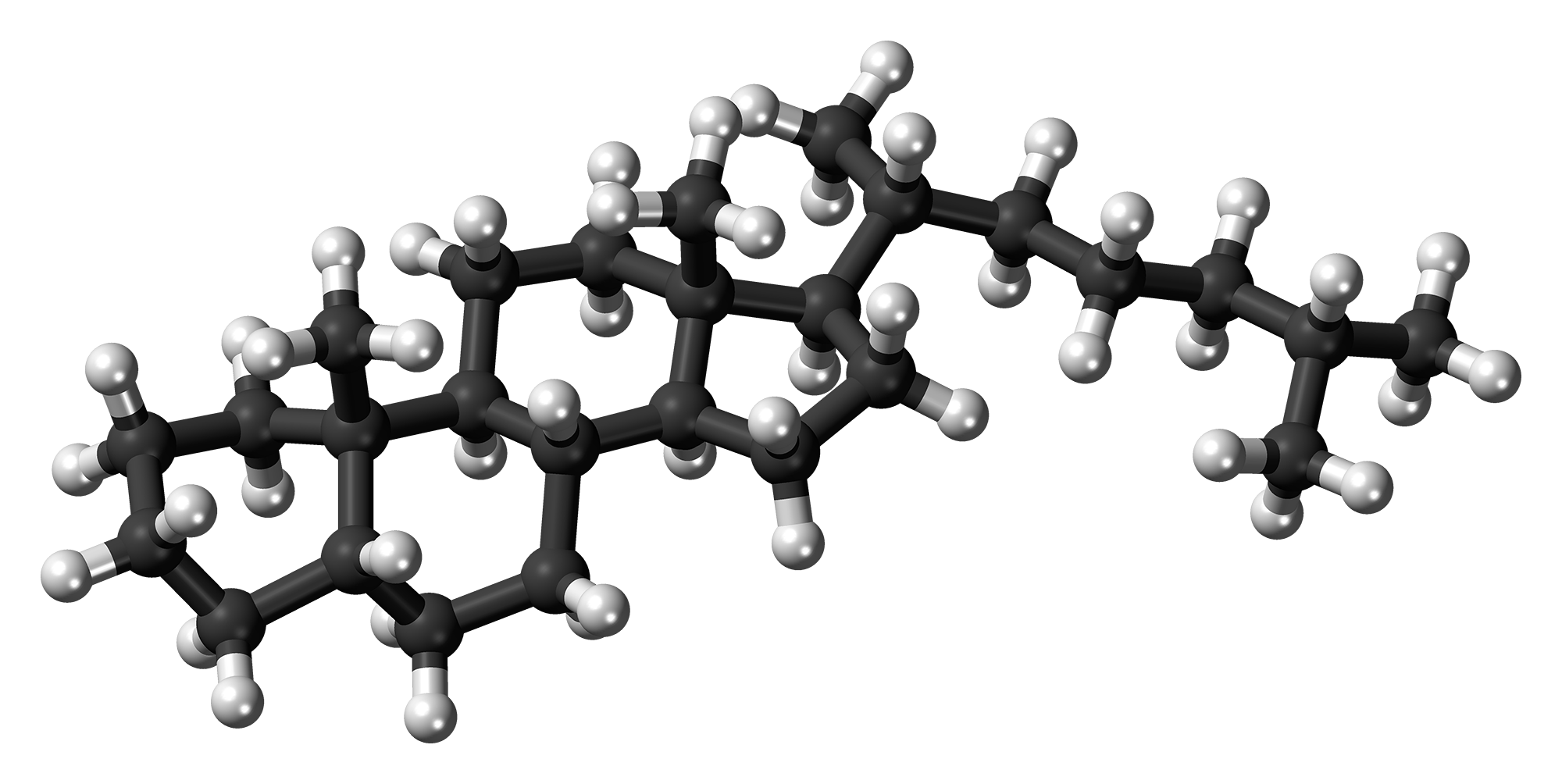

Names
- IUPAC name 5β-Cholestane
- Systematic IUPAC name (1R,3aS,3bR,5aS,9aS,9bS,11aR)-9a,11a-Dimethyl-1-[(2R)-6-methylheptan-2-yl]hexadecahydro-1H-cyclopenta[a]phenanthrene

Identifiers
CAS Number	481-20-9
3D model (JSmol)	Interactive image
Beilstein Reference	2051807
ChEBI	CHEBI:35517
ChemSpider	4446724
PubChem CID	5283630
UNII	6P255N992E
- InChI: InChI=1S/C27H48/c1-19(2)9-8-10-20(3)23-14-15-24-22-13-12-21-11-6-7-17-26(21,4)25(22)16-18-27(23,24)5/h19-25H,6-18H2,1-5H3/t20-,21+,22+,23-,24+,25+,26+,27-/m1/s1 Key: XIIAYQZJNBULGD-CJPSHIORSA-N
- SMILES: C[C@H](CCCC(C)C)[C@H]1CC[C@@H]2[C@@]1(CC[C@H]3[C@H]2CC[C@H]4[C@@]3(CCCC4)C)C

Properties
Chemical formula	C_{27}H_{48}
Molar mass	372.681 g·mol^{−1}

Related compounds
Related Stanols	24-ethyl coprostanol coprostanol
- Except where otherwise noted, data are given for materials in their standard state (at 25 °C [77 °F], 100 kPa). Infobox references

Coprostane, also known as 5β-cholestane, is a sterane and a parent compound of a variety of steroid derivatives, such as ecdysone and coprostanol.
