= Cholestenol Delta-isomerase =

Enzyme

Cholestenol Δ-isomerase

Identifiers
- EC no.: 5.3.3.5
- CAS no.: 37318-47-1

Databases
- IntEnz: IntEnz view
- BRENDA: BRENDA entry
- ExPASy: NiceZyme view
- KEGG: KEGG entry
- MetaCyc: metabolic pathway
- PRIAM: profile
- PDB structures: RCSB PDB PDBe PDBsum
- Gene Ontology: AmiGO / QuickGO
Search
- PMC: articles
- PubMed: articles
- NCBI: proteins

In enzymology, a cholestenol Δ-isomerase (EC 5.3.3.5) is an enzyme that catalyzes the chemical reaction

5alpha-cholest-7-en-3beta-ol $\rightleftharpoons$ 5alpha-cholest-8-en-3beta-ol

Hence, this enzyme has one substrate, 5alpha-cholest-7-en-3beta-ol, and one product, 5alpha-cholest-8-en-3beta-ol.

This enzyme belongs to the family of isomerases, specifically those intramolecular oxidoreductases transposing C=C bonds. The systematic name of this enzyme class is Delta7-cholestenol Delta7-Delta8-isomerase. This enzyme participates in biosynthesis of steroids.

== See also ==
- Emopamil binding protein
