= Clovis First =

Hypothesis about first human presence in the Americas

The Clovis First hypothesis refers to the thesis that the Clovis culture represents the earliest human presence in the Americas about 13,000 years ago. The hypothesis dominated thinking on the peopling of the Americas for much of the 20th century.

Numerous claims of earlier human presence began to challenge the Clovis first model beginning in the 1990s, culminating in significant discoveries at Monte Verde, Chile, dating back 14,500 years.

== Early dominance ==
A 2005 study from Rutgers University theorized that the pre-1492 native populations of the Americas are the descendants of only 70 individuals who crossed the land bridge between Asia and North America.

Historically, theories about migration into the Americas have revolved around migration from Beringia through the interior of North America. The discovery of artifacts in association with Pleistocene faunal remains near Clovis, New Mexico, in the early 1930s required extension of the timeframe for the settlement of North America to the period during which glaciers were still extensive. That led to the hypothesis of a migration route between the Laurentide and Cordilleran ice sheets to explain the early settlement. The Clovis site was host to a lithic technology characterized by spear points with an indentation, or flute, where the point was attached to the shaft. A lithic complex characterized by the Clovis Point technology was subsequently identified over much of North America and in South America. The association of Clovis complex technology with late Pleistocene faunal remains led to the theory that it marked the arrival of big game hunters that migrated out of Beringia and then dispersed throughout the Americas, otherwise known as the Clovis First theory.

== Later challenges ==
The hypothesis was challenged in the 2000s by the secure dating of archaeological sites in the Americas to before 13,000 years ago.

Recent radiocarbon dating of Clovis sites has yielded ages of between 13,000 and 12,600 BP, somewhat later than dates derived from older techniques. The re-evaluation of earlier radiocarbon dates led to the conclusion that no fewer than 11 of the 22 Clovis sites with radiocarbon dates are "problematic" and should be disregarded, including the type site in Clovis, New Mexico. Numerical dating of Clovis sites has allowed comparison of Clovis dates with dates of other archaeological sites throughout the Americas, and of the opening of the ice-free corridor. Both lead to significant challenges to the Clovis First theory. The Monte Verde site of Southern Chile has been dated at 14,800 BP. The Paisley Cave site in eastern Oregon yielded a 14,500 BP, on a coprolite with human DNA and radiocarbon dates of 13,200 and 12,900 BP on horizons containing western stemmed points. Artifact horizons with non-Clovis lithic assemblages and pre-Clovis ages occur in eastern North America, although the maximum ages tend to be poorly constrained.

Recent studies have suggested that the ice-free corridor opened later (around 13,800 ± 500 years ago) than the earliest widely accepted archaeological sites in the Americas, suggesting that it could not have been used as the route for the earliest peoples to migrate south.

An alternative to the Beringia route is proposed by the "stepping stones" hypothesis. The frequent submergence of islands along the Bering Transitory Archipelago would have forced the inhabitants of these island to continue traveling across the archipelago until they reached the mainland.
