= Zymostenol =

Names
- IUPAC name (3S,5S,10S,13R,14R,17R)-10,13-dimethyl-17-[(2R)-6-methylheptan-2-yl]-2,3,4,5,6,7,11,12,14,15,16,17-dodecahydro-1H-cyclopenta[a]phenanthren-3-ol
- Other names (5α)-cholest-8-en-3β-ol

Identifiers
CAS Number	566-97-2
3D model (JSmol)	Interactive image
ChEBI	CHEBI:16608
ChemSpider	566-97-2
KEGG	C03845
PubChem CID	101770
UNII	L3GY707BLC
CompTox Dashboard (EPA)	DTXSID30205162
- InChI: InChI=1S/C27H46O/c1-18(2)7-6-8-19(3)23-11-12-24-22-10-9-20-17-21(28)13-15-26(20,4)25(22)14-16-27(23,24)5/h18-21,23-24,28H,6-17H2,1-5H3/t19-,20+,21+,23-,24+,26+,27-/m1/s1 Key: QETLKNDKQOXZRP-XTGBIJOFSA-N
- SMILES: C[C@H](CCCC(C)C)[C@@]1([H])CC[C@@]([C@]1(C)CC2)([H])C3=C2[C@]4(C)[C@](CC3)([H])C[C@@H](O)CC4

Properties
Chemical formula	C_{27}H_{46}O
Molar mass	386.664 g·mol^{−1}
Appearance	crystalline solid
- Except where otherwise noted, data are given for materials in their standard state (at 25 °C [77 °F], 100 kPa). (what is ?) Infobox references

Zymostenol is an intermediate compound in the biosynthesis of cholesterol and other sterols. It is formed during the conversion of lanosterol to cholesterol, a critical metabolic pathway in animals, fungi, and some protozoa.

== Biosynthesis ==
Zymostenol is produced from 14-demethyl lanosterol via the action of sterol Δ8,7-sterol isomerase (emopamil binding protein, EBP). This step is part of the Bloch pathway of cholesterol biosynthesis, where zymostenol is further converted to zymosterol and then to 7-dehydrocholesterol, a direct precursor to cholesterol.
