= 1,3,5-Triheptylbenzene =

Names
- Preferred IUPAC name 1,3,5-Triheptylbenzene

Identifiers
CAS Number	29536-29-6
3D model (JSmol)	Interactive image
PubChem CID	13215619
CompTox Dashboard (EPA)	DTXSID601336527
- InChI: InChI=1S/C27H48/c1-4-7-10-13-16-19-25-22-26(20-17-14-11-8-5-2)24-27(23-25)21-18-15-12-9-6-3/h22-24H,4-21H2,1-3H3 Key: WOTYXTUCGMCWKS-UHFFFAOYSA-N
- SMILES: CCCCCCCc1cc(CCCCCCC)cc(CCCCCCC)c1

Properties
Chemical formula	C_{27}H_{48}
Molar mass	372.681 g·mol^{−1}
Density	0.855±0.06 g·cm^{−3}
Boiling point	152–154 °C (425–427 K)（0.02 Torr）
Solubility in water	2.3×10^{−8} g·L^{−1}
- Except where otherwise noted, data are given for materials in their standard state (at 25 °C [77 °F], 100 kPa). Infobox references

1,3,5-Triheptylbenzene (also called sym-triheptylbenzene) is an aromatic organic compound with a chemical formula C_{27}H_{48} and molar mass 372.67 g/mol. It can be prepared by the hydrogenation reduction reaction of 1,1',1''-(benzene-1,3,5-triyl)tris(heptan-1-one). Alternatively, 1-nonyne trimerizes to 1,3,5-triheptylbenzene when catalyzed by rhodium trichloride.
