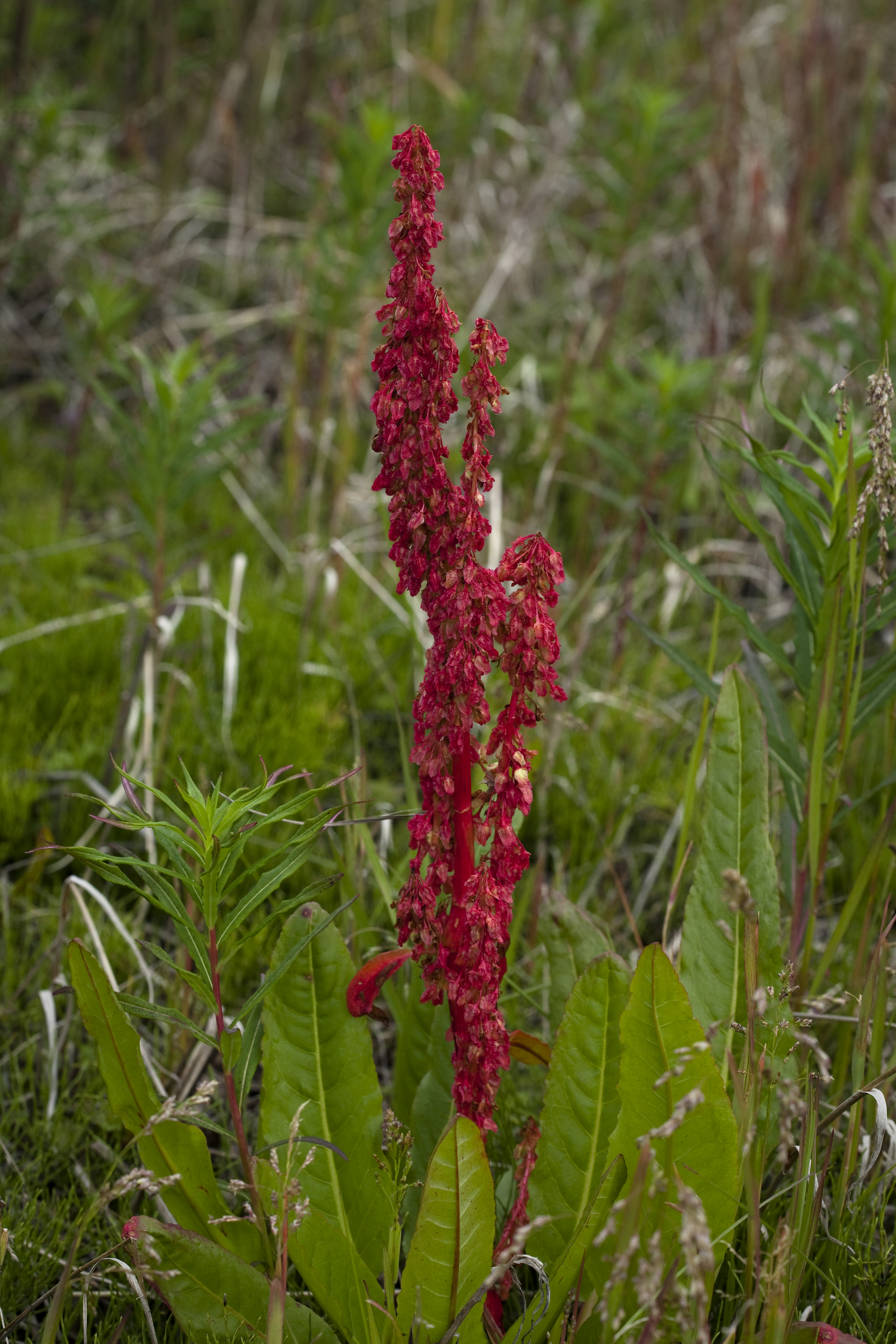

Scientific classification
- Kingdom: Plantae
- Clade: Tracheophytes
- Clade: Angiosperms
- Clade: Eudicots
- Order: Caryophyllales
- Family: Polygonaceae
- Genus: Rumex
- Species: R. arcticus

Binomial name
- Rumex arcticus Trautv.

= Rumex arcticus =

Species of flowering plant

Rumex arcticus, commonly known as arctic dock or sourdock, is a perennial flowering plant that is native to Arctic and subarctic regions. Its leaves are an important part of the diet of the Alaska Natives such as the Yup'ik people, who include it in various dishes such as akutaq.
