= Kuparuk River =

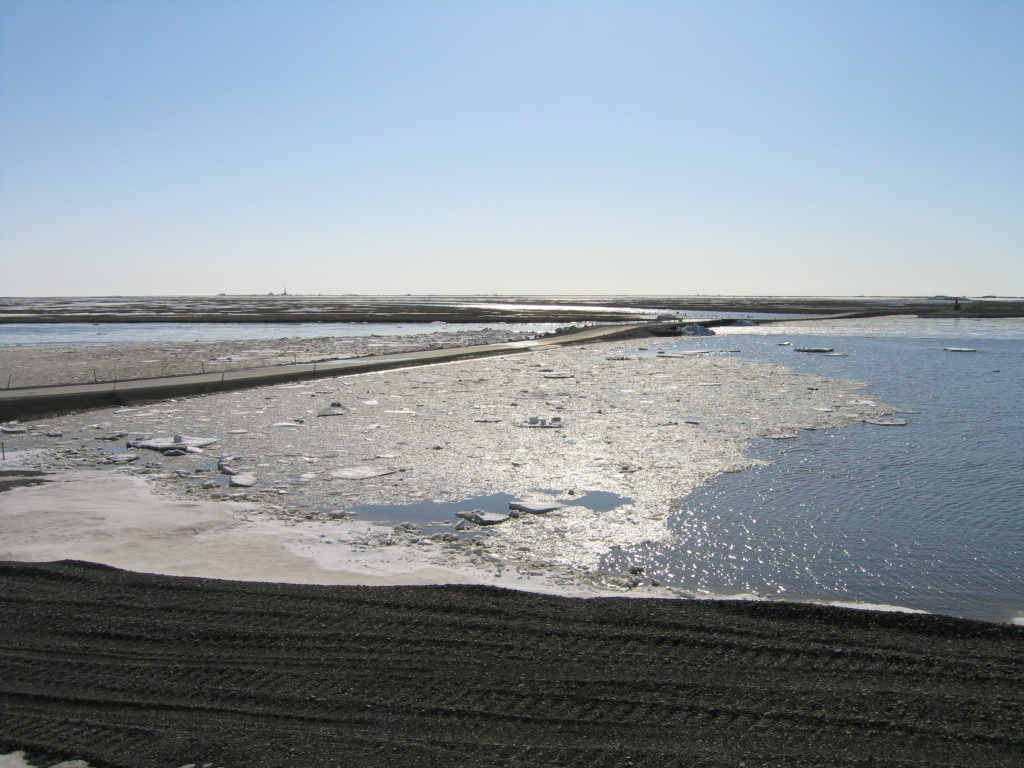
- Spring ice breakup in 2011

- Location of the mouth of the Kuparuk River in Alaska
- Native name: Kuukpaaġruk (Inupiaq)

Location
- Country: United States
- State: Alaska
- Borough: North Slope

Physical characteristics
- Source
  - location: Brooks Range
  - coordinates: 68°32′15″N 149°14′46″W
  - elevation: 2,900 ft (880 m)
- Mouth: Gwydyr Bay, Beaufort Sea
  - location: 8 miles (13 km) southeast of Beechey Point
  - coordinates: 70°25′28″N 148°52′15″W
  - elevation: 0 ft (0 m)
- Length: 200 mi (320 km)
- Basin size: 3,130 sq mi (8,100 km^{2})
- Discharge
  - average: 1,400 cu ft/s (40 m^{3}/s)

The Kuparuk River (Iñupiaq: Kuukpaaġruk) is a river in Alaska's North Slope that enters a bay on the Beaufort Sea between Beechey Point and Prudhoe Bay. The north-flowing river is about 200 miles (320 km) long, and its delta is about 3 miles (5 km) wide. Its Eskimo name appeared on a map drawn in 1901 by a prospector who spelled it Koopowra, which he translated as Big River. Kuukpaaġruk can be translated to a "smaller version of a big river".

Kuparuk Mound, a 30-foot (9.1 m) pingo about 12 miles (19 km) southeast of Beechey Point, is named after the river. Arctic explorer Ernest de Koven Leffingwell named the mound, which he used as a triangulation station in 1911.

The Kuparuk River oil field, the second largest oil field in North America, is centered about 40 miles (64 km) west of Prudhoe Bay. Discovered in 1969, it covers about 500 square miles (1,300 km^{2}).

== See also ==
- List of rivers of Alaska
