= Sterol =

Type of organic compound

Gonan-3-ol, the simplest sterol

A sterol is any organic compound with a skeleton closely related to cholestan-3-ol and having a hydroxyl group at carbon 3. The simplest sterol is gonan-3-ol, which has a formula of C_{17}H_{28}O, and is derived from that of gonane by replacement of a hydrogen atom on C3 position by a hydroxyl group. It is therefore an alcohol of gonane.

More generally, any compounds that contain the gonane structure, additional functional groups, and/or modified ring systems derived from gonane are called steroids. Therefore, sterols are a subgroup of the steroids. They occur naturally in most eukaryotes, including plants, animals, and fungi, and can also be produced by some bacteria (but likely with different functions). The most familiar type of animal sterol is cholesterol, which is vital to the structure of the cell membrane, and functions as a precursor to vitamin D and steroid hormones. While technically alcohols, sterols are classified by biochemists as lipids (fats in the broader sense of the term).

Some sources make a distinction between sterols and stanols. In this context, the difference between them is analogous to the difference between cholesterol and cholestanol, in that sterols have an unsaturated gonane skeleton, while stanols do not. (Note: The word stenol exists to exclusively refer to a sterol with a double bond in the main rings. However, usage of this word is rare outside of compounds such as cholestenol.)

The gonane skeleton, with the IUPAC recommended numbering of the carbon atoms

== Types ==
=== Phytosterols ===
Phytosterols are sterols naturally found in plants. Notable examples of phytosterols include campesterol, sitosterol, and stigmasterol.

=== Zoosterols ===
Zoosterols are sterols found in animals. The most significant zoosterol is cholesterol.

=== Mycosterols ===
Sterols found in fungi are called mycosterols. A common example is ergosterol, a mycosterol present in the cell membrane of fungi, where it serves a role similar to cholesterol in animal cells.

== Role in biochemistry ==
Sterols and related compounds play essential roles in the physiology of eukaryotic organisms, and are essential for normal physiology of plants, animals, and fungi. For example, cholesterol forms part of the cellular membrane in animals, where it affects the cell membrane's fluidity and serves as secondary messenger in developmental signaling. In humans and other animals, corticosteroids such as cortisol act as signaling compounds in cellular communication and general metabolism. Sterols are common components of human skin oils.

=== Phytosterols as a nutritional supplement ===
Phytosterols, more commonly known as plant sterols, have been shown in clinical trials to block cholesterol absorption sites in the human intestine, thus helping to reduce cholesterol absorption in humans. They are currently approved by the U.S. Food and Drug Administration for use as a food supplement; however, there is some concern that they may block absorption not only of cholesterol, but of other important nutrients as well. At present, the American Heart Association has recommended that supplemental plant sterols be taken only by those diagnosed with elevated cholesterol, and has particularly recommended that they not be taken by pregnant women or nursing mothers. Functional foods enriched with plant sterols/stanols have become the most widely used nonprescription cholesterol-lowering approach. Preliminary research has shown that phytosterols may have anticancer effects.

== Chemical classification and structure ==
Sterols are a subgroup of steroids with a hydroxyl group at the 3-position of the A-ring. They are amphipathic lipids synthesized from acetyl-coenzyme A via the HMG-CoA reductase pathway. Sterols are not flat, because they have several carbon atoms that have single bonds to three other carbon atoms and are therefore tetrahedral chiral centres. Only certain stereoisomers occur in nature. The hydroxyl group on the A ring is polar. The rest of the aliphatic chain is non-polar.

There are multiple ways to classify sterols, including by:

- Source or origin of sterol. Sterols can be found in animals (zoosterols), plants (phytosterols), and fungi (mycosterols).
- Methyl group presence on C-4. This carbon can exhibit 0, 1, or 2 methyl groups, known as 4-desmethyl, 4α-monomethyl, and 4,4-dimethyl sterols, respectively.
- Side chain presence on C-24. Examples include 24-desmethyl (e.g. cholesterol), 24-methyl (e.g. campesterol), and 24-ethyl (e.g. stigmasterol or β-sitosterol).
- Unsaturation of sterol. Double bonds are common at the 5,6-position (termed Δ5 sterols, e.g. cholesterol), the 7,8-position (termed Δ7 sterols, e.g. lathosterol), or both (termed Δ5,7 sterols, e.g. ergosterol and 7-dehydrocholesterol).

== See also ==
- Cholesterol
- Ergosterol
- Hopanoids
- Hydroxysteroid
- Phytosterol
- Steroids
- Zoosterol
- Zymosterol
