= 24-Ethyl coprostanol =

Biomarker of agricultural faecal contamination

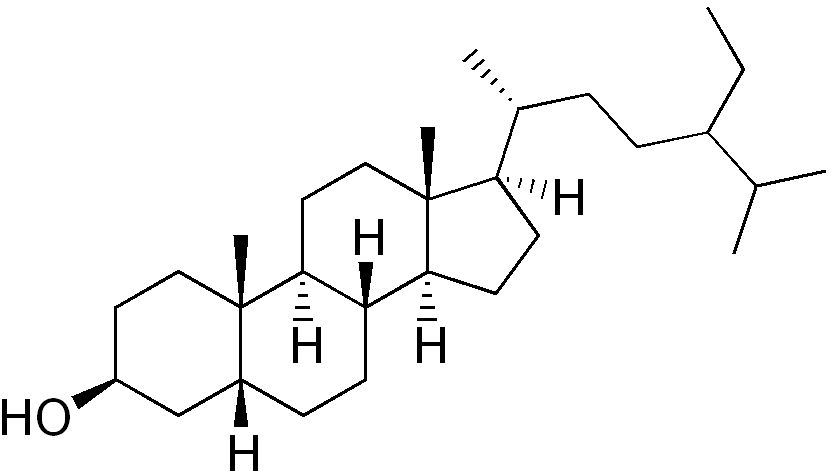

Names
- IUPAC name 5β-Stigmastan-3β-ol
- Systematic IUPAC name (1R,3aS,3bR,5aR,7S,9aS,9bS,11aR)-1-[(2R)-5-Ethyl-6-methylheptan-2-yl]-9a,11a-dimethylhexadecahydro-1H-cyclopenta[a]phenanthren-7-ol
- Other names (3β,5β)-Stigmastan-3-ol, (24R)-Ethylcoprostanol, 24a-Ethylcoprostanol, Copro-β-sitostanol, Coprostigmastanol

Identifiers
CAS Number	4736-91-8
3D model (JSmol)	Interactive image
ChEBI	CHEBI:133627
ChemSpider	57566566
PubChem CID	57461357
UNII	WW368UVU6Y
CompTox Dashboard (EPA)	DTXSID10726683
- InChI: InChI=1S/C29H52O/c1-7-21(19(2)3)9-8-20(4)25-12-13-26-24-11-10-22-18-23(30)14-16-28(22,5)27(24)15-17-29(25,26)6/h19-27,30H,7-18H2,1-6H3/t20-,21?,22-,23+,24+,25-,26+,27+,28+,29-/m1/s1 Key: LGJMUZUPVCAVPU-OKGOGUTDSA-N
- SMILES: O[C@H]1CC[C@@]2(C)[C@@](CC[C@]3([H])[C@@]([H])2CC[C@@]4(C)[C@]([H])3CC[C@@]([H])4[C@@H](CCC(CC)C(C)C)C)([H])C1

Properties
Chemical formula	C_{29}H_{52}O
Molar mass	416.72
- Except where otherwise noted, data are given for materials in their standard state (at 25 °C [77 °F], 100 kPa). verify (what is ?) Infobox references

24-Ethyl coprostanol (24-ethyl 5β-cholestan-3β-ol) is a 29 carbon stanol formed from the biohydrogenation of β-sitosterol (24-ethyl cholest-5en-3β-ol, 24-ethyl cholesterol) in the gastrointestinal tract of most higher animals, especially herbivores. This compound has been used as a biomarker for the presence of agricultural (non-human) faecal matter in nature.
