= Beringia =

Geographical region of Asia and North America currently partly submerged

Beringia sea levels (blues) and land elevations (browns) measured in metres from 21,000 years ago to present

Beringia is a prehistoric geographical region, defined as the land and maritime area bounded on the west by the Lena River in Russia; on the east by the Mackenzie River in Canada; on the north by 72° north latitude in the Chukchi Sea; and on the south by the tip of the Kamchatka Peninsula. It includes the Chukchi Sea, the Bering Sea, the Bering Strait, the Chukchi and Kamchatka peninsulas in Russia as well as Alaska in the United States and Yukon in Canada.

The area includes land lying on the North American plate and Siberian land east of the Chersky Range. At various times, it formed a land bridge referred to as the Bering land bridge or the Bering Strait land bridge that was up to 1,000 km (620 mi) wide at its greatest extent and which covered an area as large as British Columbia and Alberta together, totaling about 1.6 million km^{2} (620,000 sq mi), allowing biological dispersal to occur between Asia and North America. Today, the only land that is visible from the central part of the Bering land bridge are the Diomede Islands, the Pribilof Islands of St. Paul and St. George, St. Lawrence Island, St. Matthew Island, and King Island.

It is believed that a small human population of at most a few thousand arrived in Beringia from eastern Siberia during the Last Glacial Maximum before expanding into the settlement of the Americas sometime before 23,000 and 21,000 years before present (YBP). This would have occurred as the American glaciers blocking the way southward melted but before the bridge was covered by the sea about 11,000 YBP.

== Geography ==
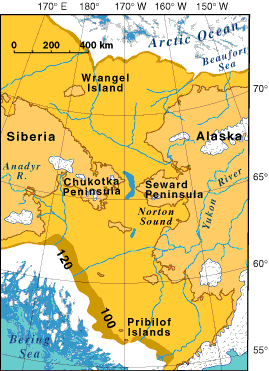
Bering land bridge – Wisconsin glaciation

The remains of Late Pleistocene mammals that had been discovered on the Aleutians and islands in the Bering Sea at the close of the 19th century indicated that a past land connection might lie beneath the shallow waters between Alaska and Chukotka. The underlying mechanism was first thought to be plate tectonics, but by 1930 changes in the ice mass balance which led to global sea-level fluctuations were viewed as the cause of the Bering land bridge. In 1937, Eric Hultén proposed that around the Aleutians and the Bering Strait region were tundra plants that had originally dispersed from a now-submerged plain between Alaska and Chukotka, which he named Beringia after Vitus Bering who had sailed into the strait in 1728. The distribution of plants in the genera Erythranthe and Pinus are good examples of this, as very similar genera members are found in Asia and the Americas.

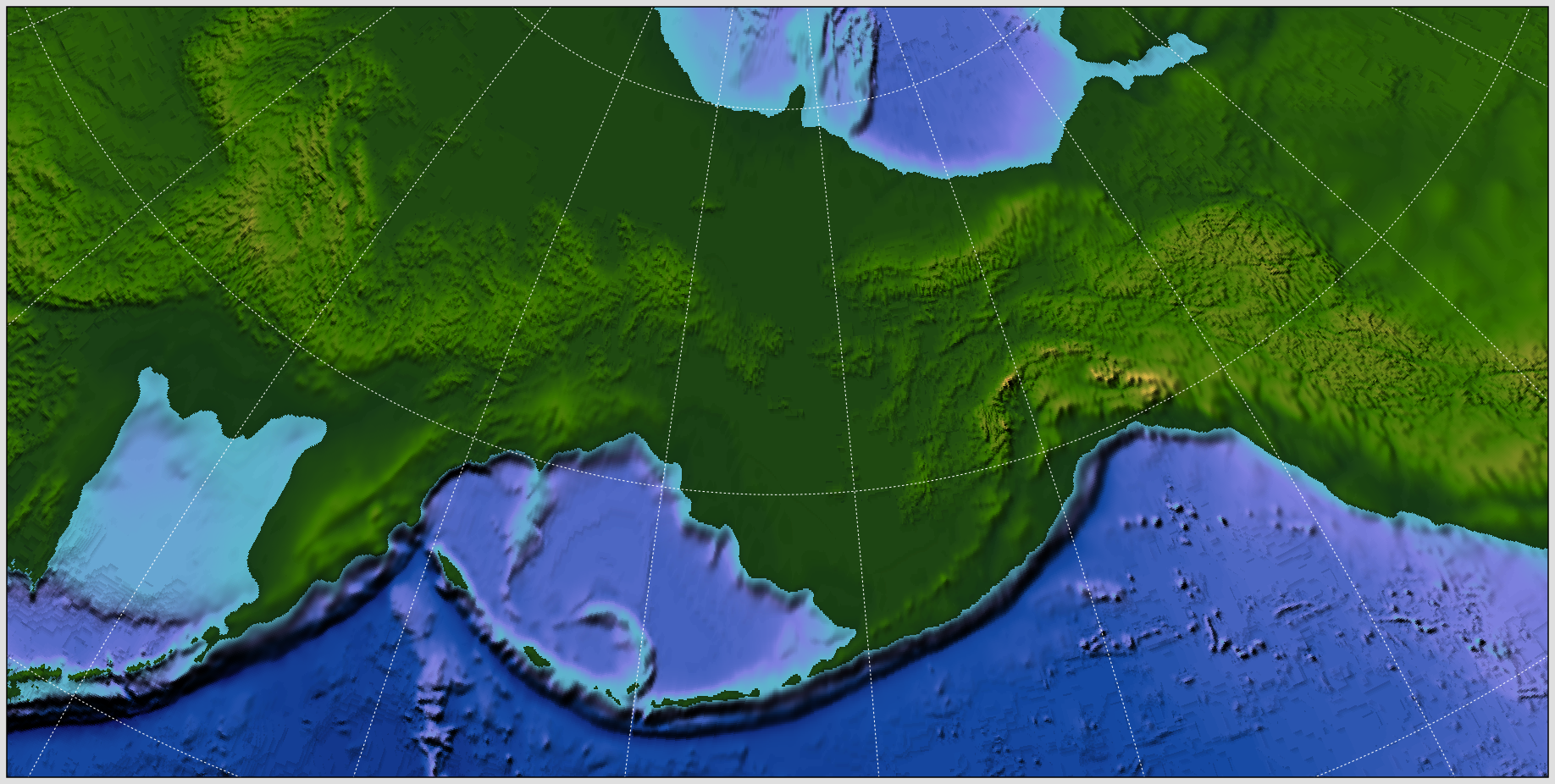
Low terrain covered most of Beringia

American arctic geologist David Hopkins redefined Beringia to include portions of Alaska and Northeast Asia. Beringia was later regarded as extending from the Verkhoyansk Mountains in the west to the Mackenzie River in the east. During the Pleistocene epoch, global cooling led periodically to the expansion of glaciers and the lowering of sea levels; these processes created land connections in various regions around the globe. Today, the average water depth of the Bering Strait is 40–50 m (130–160 ft); therefore the land bridge opened when the sea level was more than 50 m (160 ft) below the current level. A reconstruction of the sea level history of the region indicated that a seaway existed from c. 135,000 – c. 70,000 YBP, a land bridge from c. 70,000 – c. 60,000 YBP, an intermittent connection from c. 60,000 – c. 30,000 YBP, and a land bridge from c. 30,000 – c. 11,000 YBP, followed by a Holocene sea level rise that reopened the strait. Post-glacial rebound has continued to raise some sections of the coast.

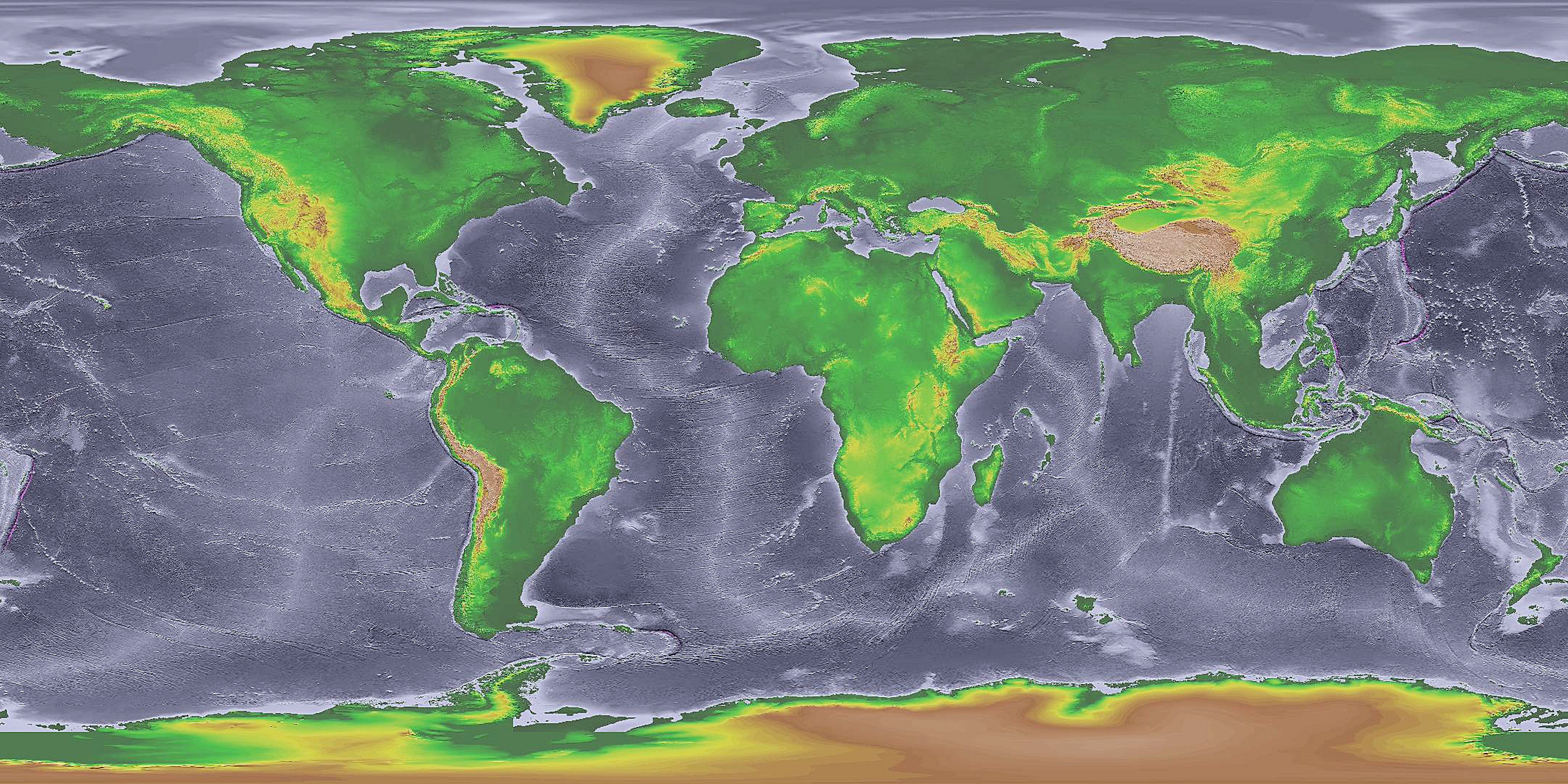
The Last Glacial Period caused a much lower global sea level

During the last glacial period, enough of the Earth's water became frozen in the great ice sheets covering North America and Europe to cause a drop in sea levels. For thousands of years the sea floors of many interglacial shallow seas were exposed, including those of the Bering Strait, the Chukchi Sea to the north, and the Bering Sea to the south.

== Refugium ==
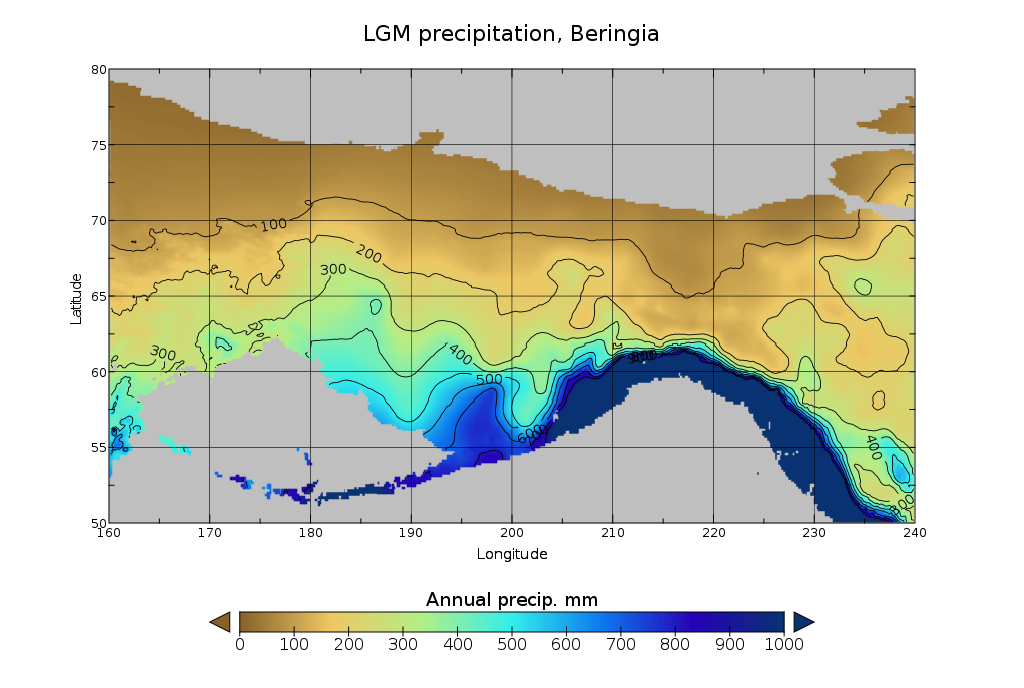
Beringia precipitation 22,000 years ago

The last glacial period, commonly (and inaccurately) referred to as the "Ice Age", spanned 125,000–14,500 YBP and was the most recent glacial period within the current ice age, which occurred during the last years of the Pleistocene epoch. The Ice Age reached its peak during the Last Glacial Maximum, when ice sheets began advancing from 33,000 YBP and reached their maximum limits 26,500 YBP. Deglaciation commenced in the Northern Hemisphere approximately 19,000 YBP and in Antarctica approximately 14,500 years YBP, and the bridge was finally inundated around 11,000 YBP. These dates are consistent with evidence that glacial meltwater was the primary source for an abrupt rise in sea level 14,500 YBP. The fossil evidence from many continents points to the extinction of large animals near the end of the last glaciation.

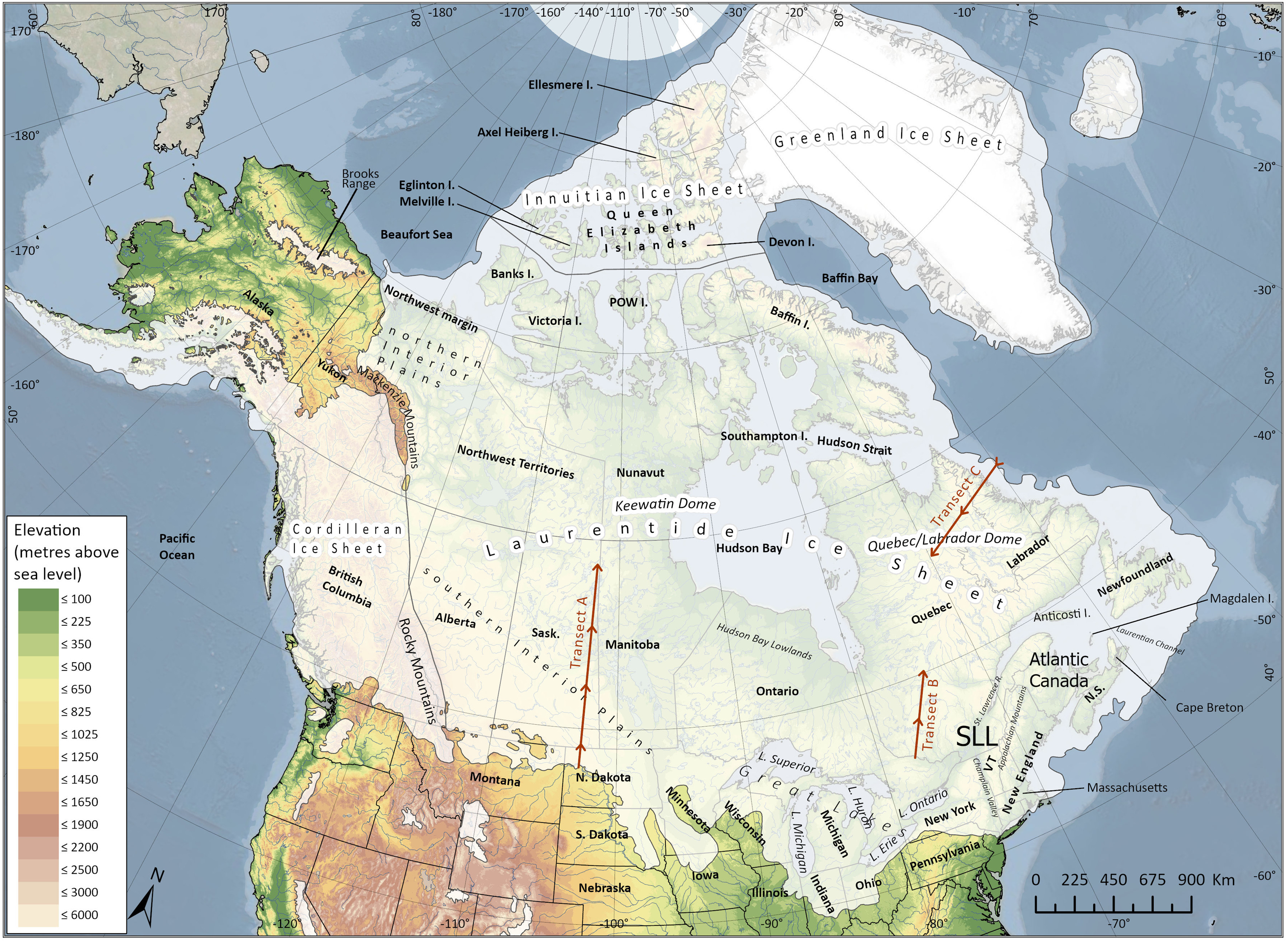
The maximum extent of North American ice sheets during the Last Glacial Maximum c. 20,000 years ago

During the Ice Age a vast, cold and dry mammoth steppe stretched from the arctic islands southwards to China, and from the Iberian Peninsula eastwards across Eurasia and over the Bering land bridge into Alaska and the Yukon where it was blocked by the Wisconsin glaciation. Therefore, the flora and fauna of Beringia were more related to those of Eurasia rather than North America. Beringia received more moisture and intermittent maritime cloud cover from the north Pacific Ocean than the rest of the mammoth steppe, including the dry environments on either side of it. This moisture supported a shrub-tundra habitat that provided an ecological refugium for plants and animals. In eastern Beringia 35,000 YBP, the northern arctic areas experienced temperatures 1.5 °C (2.7 °F) degrees warmer than today, but the southern sub-arctic regions were 2 °C (4 °F) degrees cooler. During the Last Glacial Maximum 22,000 YBP the average summer temperature was 3–5 °C (5–9 °F) degrees cooler than today, with variations of 2.9 °C (5.2 °F) degrees cooler on the Seward Peninsula to 7.5 °C (13.5 °F) cooler in the Yukon. In the driest and coldest periods of the Late Pleistocene—and possibly during the entire Pleistocene—moisture occurred along a north–south gradient with the south receiving the most cloud cover and moisture due to the air-flow from the North Pacific. During the ice ages, Beringia, like most of Siberia and all of North and Northeast China, was not glaciated because snowfall was very light.

In the Late Pleistocene, Beringia was a mosaic of biological communities. Commencing from c. 57,000 YBP (marine isotope stage [MIS] 3), steppe–tundra vegetation dominated large parts of Beringia with a rich diversity of grasses and herbs. There were patches of shrub tundra with isolated refugia of larch (Larix) and spruce (Picea) forests with birch (Betula) and alder (Alnus) trees. It has been proposed that the largest and most diverse megafaunal community residing in Beringia at this time could only have been sustained in a highly diverse and productive environment.

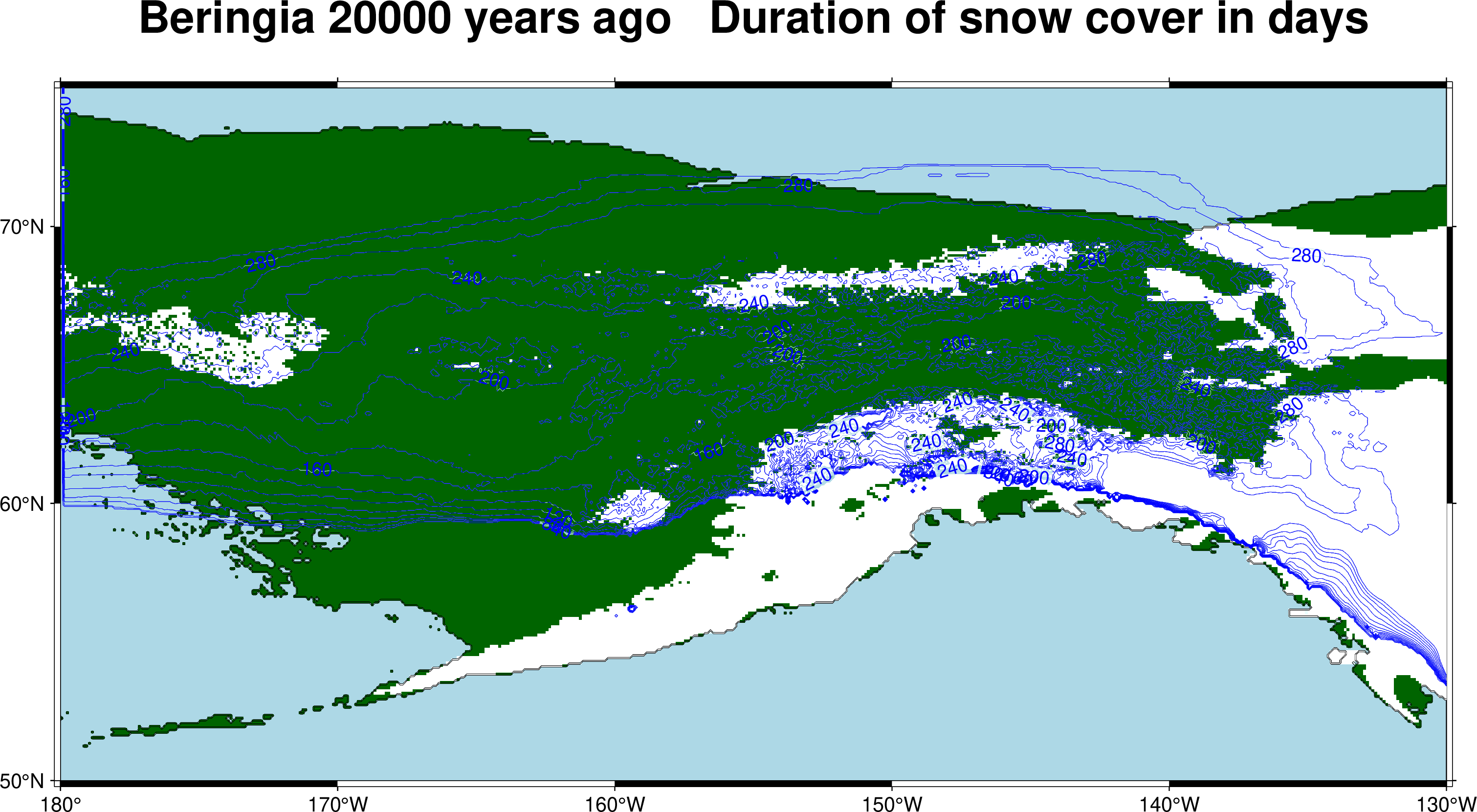
Duration of snow cover in days, East Beringia, 20000 years ago. Chelsa Trace 21ka variable bio/scd 200.

Analysis at Chukotka on the Siberian edge of the land bridge indicated that from c. 57,000 – c. 15,000 YBP (MIS 3 to MIS 2) the environment was wetter and colder than the steppe–tundra to the east and west, with warming in parts of Beringia from c. 15,000 YBP. These changes provided the most likely explanation for mammal migrations after c. 15,000 YBP, as the warming provided increased forage for browsers and mixed feeders. At the beginning of the Holocene, some mesic habitat–adapted species left the refugium and spread westward into what had become tundra-vegetated northern Asia and eastward into northern North America.

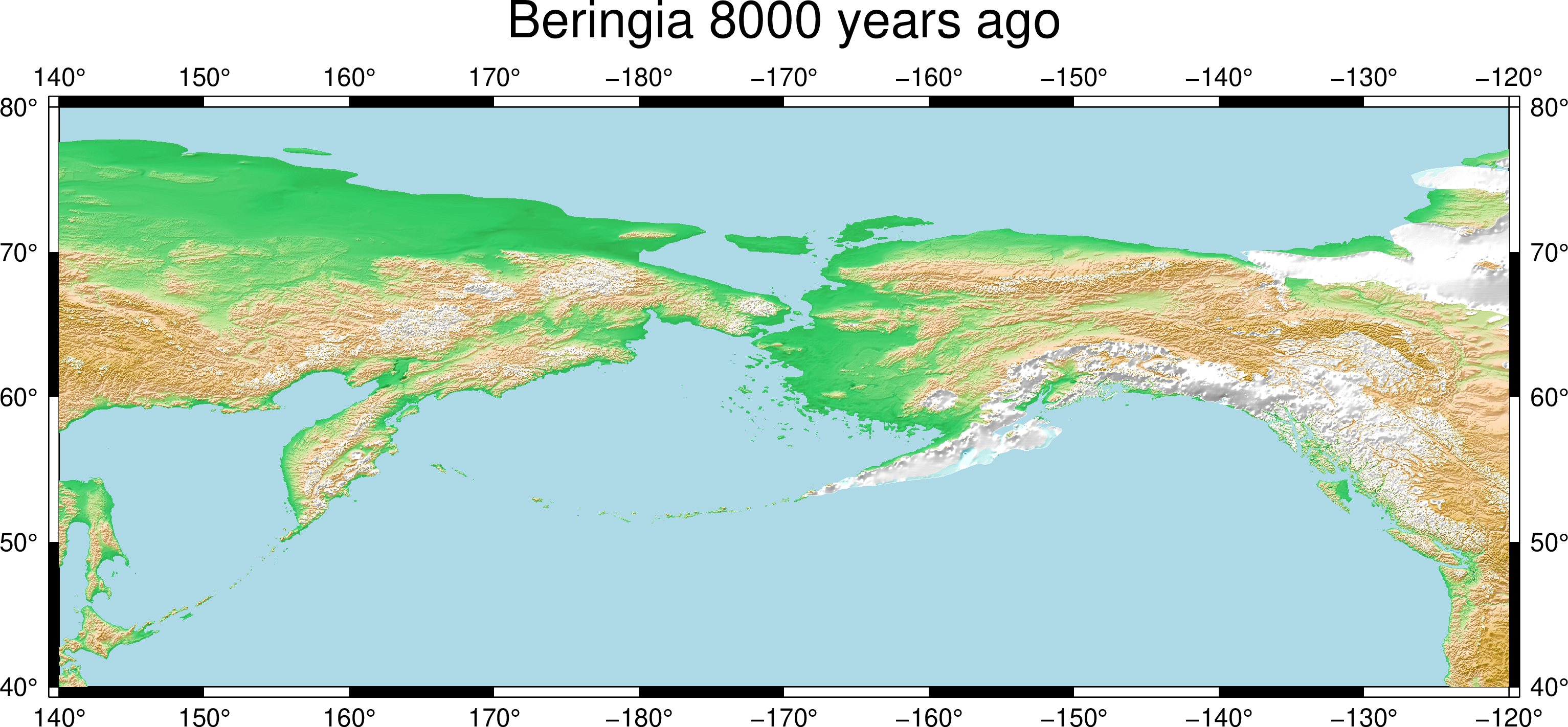
Beringia, 8000 years ago

The latest emergence of the land bridge was c. 70,000 years ago. However, from c. 24,000 – c. 13,000 YBP the Laurentide ice sheet fused with the Cordilleran ice sheet; this event allowed gene flow between Beringia (and Eurasia) and continental North America. The Yukon corridor opened between the receding ice sheets c. 13,000 YBP, and this once again allowed gene flow between Eurasia and continental North America until the land bridge was finally closed by rising sea levels c. 10,000 YBP. During the Holocene, many mesic-adapted species left the refugium and spread eastward and westward, while at the same time the forest-adapted species spread with the forests up from the south. The arid-adapted species were reduced to minor habitats or became extinct.

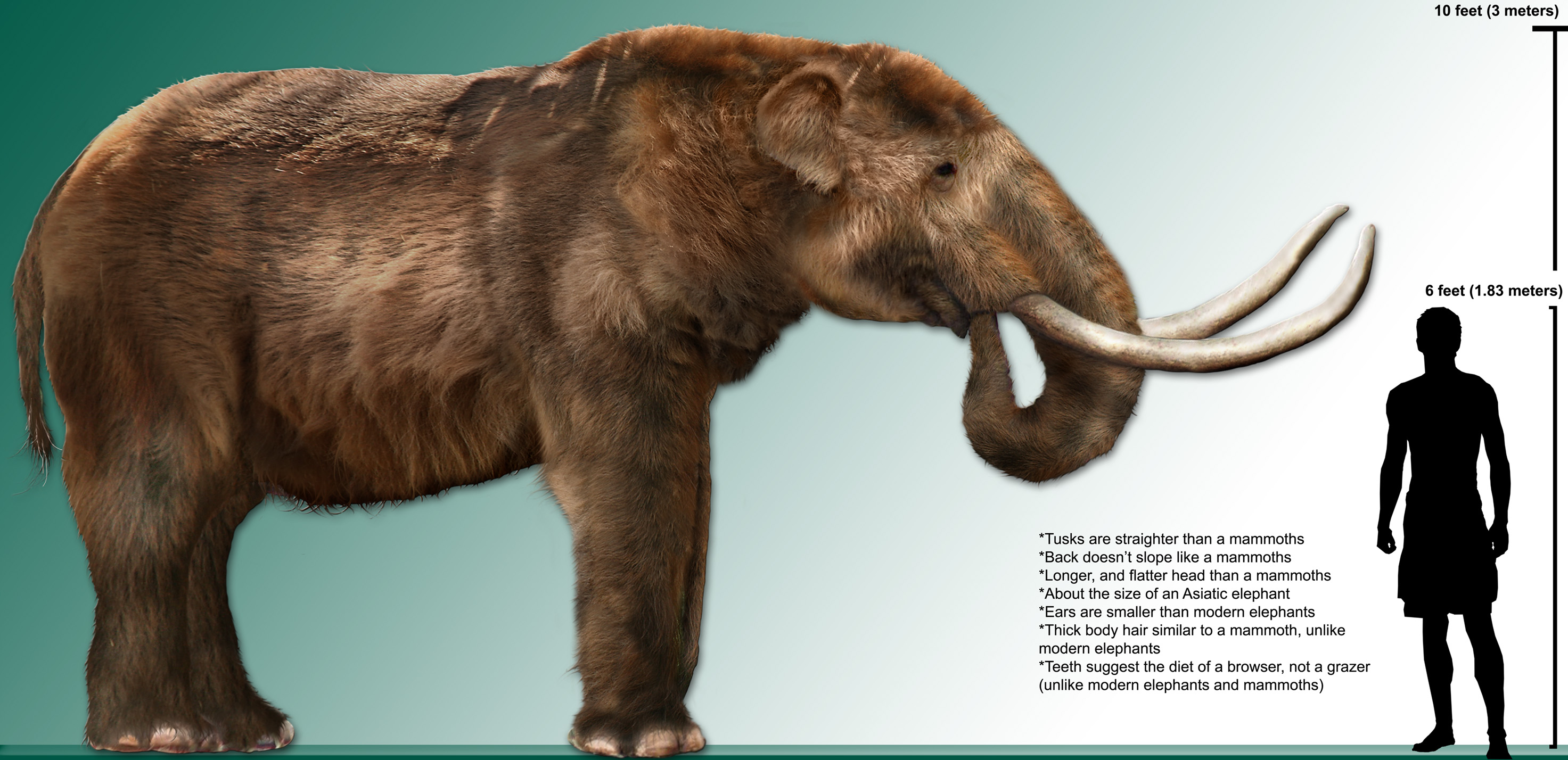
The Mammut americanum (American mastodon) became extinct around 12,000–9,000 years ago due to human-related activities, climate change, or a combination of both. See Quaternary extinction event and Holocene extinction.

The ecosystem of Beringia changed as the changing climate affected the environment, and thus determined which plants and animals were able to survive. The land mass could be a barrier as well as a bridge: during colder periods, glaciers advanced and precipitation levels dropped. During warmer intervals, clouds, rain and snow altered soils and drainage patterns. Fossil remains show that spruce, birch and poplar once grew beyond their northernmost range today, indicating that there were periods when the climate was warmer and wetter. The environmental conditions were not homogenous in Beringia. Recent stable isotope studies of woolly mammoth bone collagen demonstrate that western Beringia (Siberia) was colder and drier than eastern Beringia (Alaska and Yukon), which was more ecologically diverse.

Grey wolves suffered a species-wide population bottleneck (reduction) approximately 25,000 YBP during the Last Glacial Maximum. This was followed by a single population of modern wolves expanding out of their Beringia refuge to repopulate the wolf's former range, replacing the remaining Pleistocene wolf populations across Eurasia and North America. The extinct pine species Pinus matthewsii has been described from Pliocene sediments in the Yukon areas of the refugium.

=== Beringian Gap ===
The existence of fauna endemic to the respective Siberian and North American portions of Beringia has led to the 'Beringian Gap' hypothesis, wherein an unconfirmed geographic factor blocked migration across the land bridge when it emerged. Beringia did not block the movement of most dry steppe-adapted large species such as saiga antelope, woolly mammoth, and caballid horses. Notable restricted fauna include the woolly rhino in Siberia (which went no further east than the Anadyr River), and Arctodus simus, American badger, American kiang-like equids, Bootherium and Camelops in North America, with the existence of Homotherium being disputed in Late Pleistocene Siberia. The lack of mastodon and Megalonyx has been attributed to their inhabitation of Alaska and the Yukon being limited to interglacials. However, ground sloth environmental DNA has potentially been recovered from Siberia.

== Human habitation and migration ==
The Ancient Beringian (AB) is a human archaeogenetic lineage, based on the genome of an infant found at the Upward Sun River site (dubbed USR1), dated to 11,500 years ago. The AB lineage diverged from the Ancestral Native American (ANA) lineage about 20,000 years ago. The ANA lineage was estimated as having been formed between 20,000 and 25,000 years ago by a mixture of East Asian (~65%) and Ancient North Eurasian (~35%) lineages, consistent with the model of the peopling of the Americas via Beringia during the Last Glacial Maximum.

The peopling of the Americas is believed to have begun when Paleolithic hunter-gatherers (Paleo-Indians) entered North America from the North Asian Mammoth steppe via the Beringia land bridge, which had formed between northeastern Siberia and western Alaska due to the lowering of sea level during the Last Glacial Maximum (26,000 to 19,000 years ago). These populations expanded south of the Laurentide ice sheet, either by sea or land, and spread rapidly southward, occupying both North and South America no later than 14,000 years ago, and possibly before 20,000 years ago. The earliest populations in the Americas, before roughly 10,000 years ago, are known as Paleo-Indians. Indigenous peoples of the Americas have been linked to Siberian populations by the distribution of blood types, and in genetic composition as reflected by molecular data, such as DNA.

Around 3,000 years ago, the progenitors of the Yupik peoples settled along both sides of the straits. In 2012, the governments of Russia and the United States announced a plan to formally establish "a transboundary area of shared Beringian heritage." Among other things this agreement would establish close ties between the Bering Land Bridge National Preserve and the Cape Krusenstern National Monument in the United States and Beringia National Park in Russia.

== Previous connections ==
Biogeographical evidence demonstrates previous connections between North America and Asia. Similar dinosaur fossils occur both in Asia and in North America. Saurolophus was found in both Mongolia and western North America. Relatives of Troodon, Triceratops, and Tyrannosaurus rex all came from Asia.

The earliest Canis lupus specimen was a fossil tooth discovered at Old Crow, Yukon, Canada. The specimen was found in sediment dated 1 million YBP, however the geological attribution of this sediment is questioned. Slightly younger specimens were discovered at Cripple Creek Sump, Fairbanks, Alaska, in strata dated 810,000 YBP. Both discoveries point to the origin of these wolves in eastern Beringia during the Middle Pleistocene.

Fossil evidence also indicates an exchange of primates and plants between North America and Asia around 55.8 million years ago. Twenty million years ago, evidence in North America shows the last natural interchange of mammalian species. Some, like the ancient saber-toothed cats, have a recurring geographical range: Europe, Africa, Asia, and North America. The pattern of bidirectional flow of biota has been asymmetric, with more plants, animals, and fungi generally migrating from Asia to North America than vice versa throughout the Cenozoic.

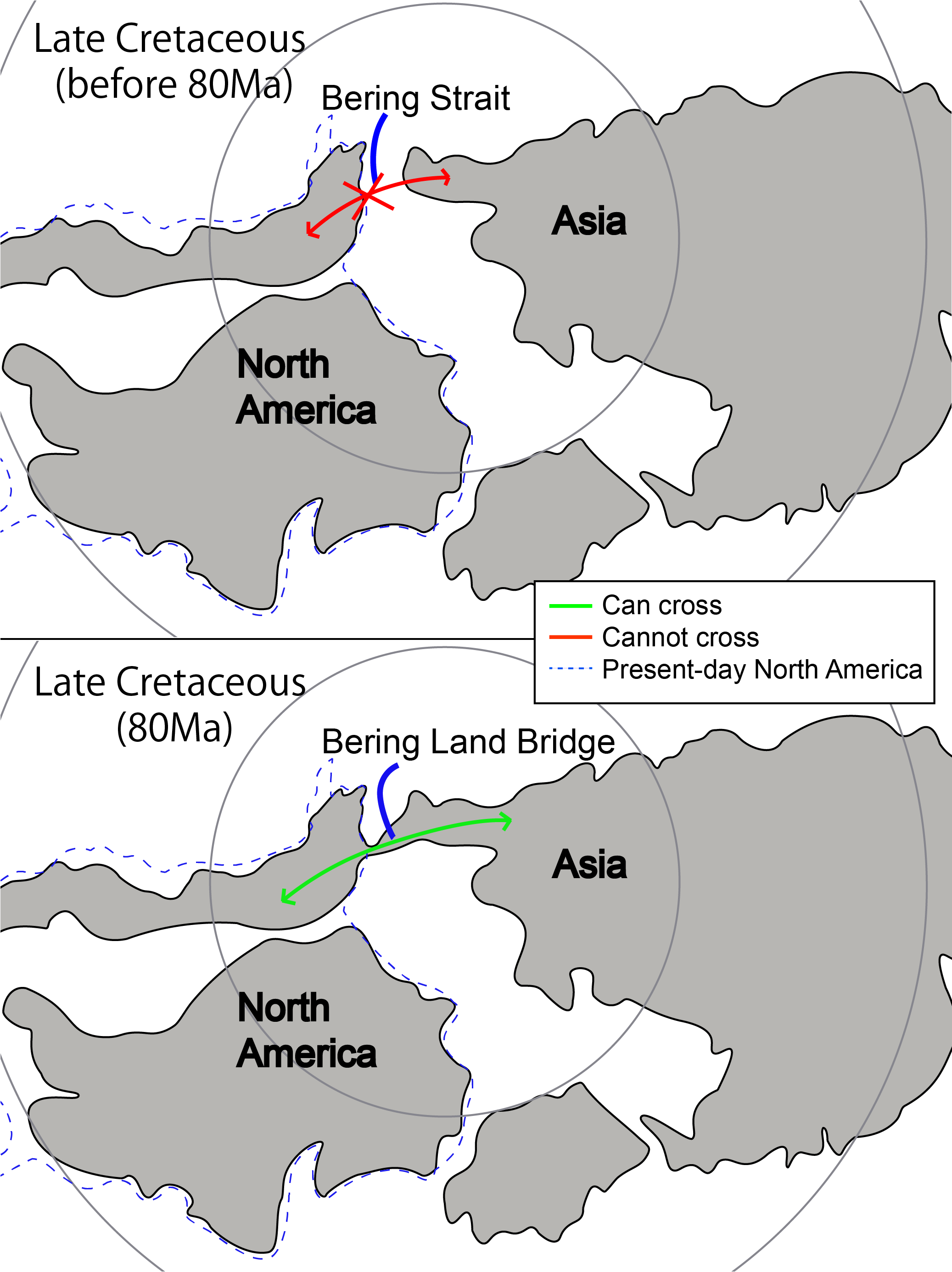
Map shows the connection between North America and Asia during the Late Cretaceous period (~80Ma).

Notable past (purple) and current (orange) land bridges on a bathymetric equirectangular projection centered on 45° E

== See also ==
- Bering Strait crossing
- Bluefish Caves
- Geologic time scale
- Little John (archeological site)
- Paleoshoreline
- Yukon Beringia Interpretive Centre
