= Bluefish Caves =

Archaeological site in Yukon, Canada

- Location in Canada
- 67°09′N 140°35′W
- Location: Near the Vuntut Gwichin community, Old Crow
- Region: Yukon, Canada

History
- Built: 24,000 BP (disputed)

Bluefish Caves is an archaeological site in Yukon, Canada, located 54 km (34 mi) southwest of the Vuntut Gwichin community of Old Crow. It has been suggested that human occupation dates to 24,000 years Before Present (BP) based on radiocarbon dating of animal remains, but these dates are contested due to the uncertain stratigraphic context of the archaeological remains relative to the dated animal remains. There are three small caves in the area.

== Context ==
Bluefish Cave was initially known to the local First Nations, but was popularized by a fishing expedition in 1976, and later by researchers. This site is made up of three small caves, ranging from 10 to 30 m^{3} (350 to 1,060 cu ft). The first cave contains various animal bones that appear to have been dragged there by predators; findings of cut marks may point to a human presence.

The Old Crow Flats, another important area with early human presence, are located about 75 km northeast of the Bluefish Caves.

== Dating ==
The site was excavated by archaeologist Jacques Cinq-Mars between 1977 and 1987, and the initial radiocarbon dating suggested an age of 24,000 before present (BP). This was considered controversial as it was in contrast to the Clovis-First theory, widely accepted by academics at the time, which considered the earliest settlement date of North America to be around 13,000 BP. A review of the site in 2017 found it to be 24,000 years old, lending support to the "Beringian standstill" hypothesis — that the ancestors of Native Americans spent considerable time isolated in a Beringian refuge during the Last Glacial Maximum before populating the Americas. A later paper questioned the dating (based on claimed disturbances) and the culturality of the faunal remains, but support for the 2017 study was reiterated by the author of that report.

== See also ==
- Beringia
- Pendejo Cave
