= Zymosterol =

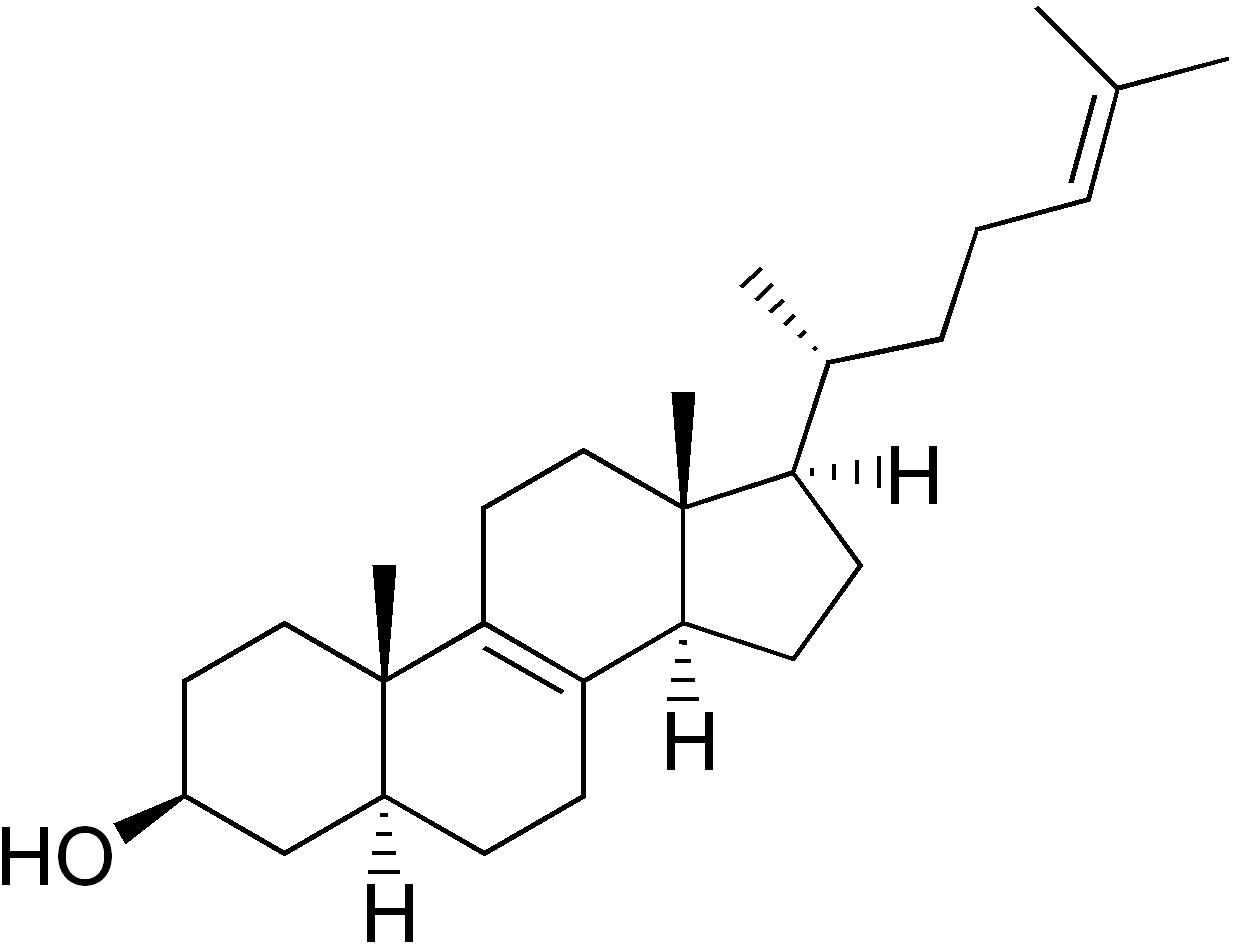

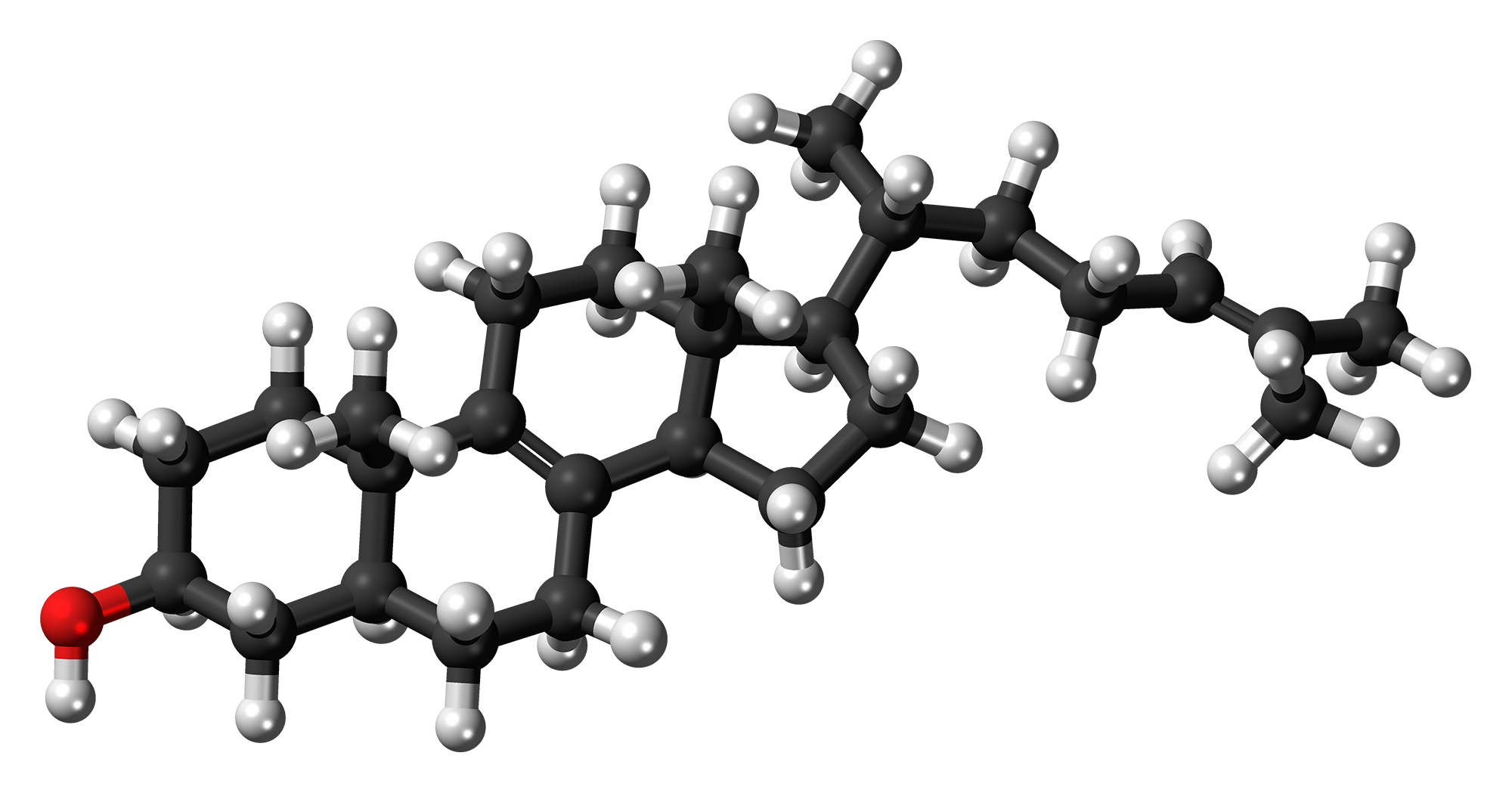

Names
- IUPAC name 5α-Cholesta-8,24-dien-3β-ol
- Systematic IUPAC name (1R,3aR,5aS,7S,9aS,11aR)-9a,11a-Dimethyl-1-[(2R)-6-methylhept-5-en-2-yl]-2,3,3a,4,5,5a,6,7,8,9,9a,10,11,11a-tetradecahydro-1H-cyclopenta[a]phenanthren-7-ol

Identifiers
CAS Number	128-33-6
3D model (JSmol)	Interactive image
ChemSpider	83724
ECHA InfoCard	100.004.438
PubChem CID	92746
UNII	PU2755PT4O
CompTox Dashboard (EPA)	DTXSID201028211
- InChI: InChI=1S/C27H44O/c1-18(2)7-6-8-19(3)23-11-12-24-22-10-9-20-17-21(28)13-15-26(20,4)25(22)14-16-27(23,24)5/h7,19-21,23-24,28H,6,8-17H2,1-5H3/t19-,20+,21+,23-,24+,26+,27-/m1/s1 Key: CGSJXLIKVBJVRY-XTGBIJOFSA-N; InChI=1/C27H44O/c1-18(2)7-6-8-19(3)23-11-12-24-22-10-9-20-17-21(28)13-15-26(20,4)25(22)14-16-27(23,24)5/h7,19-21,23-24,28H,6,8-17H2,1-5H3/t19-,20+,21+,23-,24+,26+,27-/m1/s1 Key: CGSJXLIKVBJVRY-XTGBIJOFBJ
- SMILES: O[C@H]4CC[C@@]3(/C2=C(/[C@@H]1CC[C@H]([C@H](C)CC\C=C(/C)C)[C@@]1(C)CC2)CC[C@H]3C4)C

Properties
Chemical formula	C_{27}H_{4}O
Molar mass	344.328 g·mol^{−1}
- Except where otherwise noted, data are given for materials in their standard state (at 25 °C [77 °F], 100 kPa). verify (what is ?) Infobox references

Zymosterol is an intermediate in cholesterol biosynthesis. Disregarding some intermediate compounds (e.g. 4-4-dimethylzymosterol), lanosterol can be considered a precursor of zymosterol in the cholesterol synthesis pathway. The conversion of zymosterol into cholesterol happens in the endoplasmic reticulum. Zymosterol accumulates quickly in the plasma membrane coming from the cytosol. The movement of zymosterol across the cytosol is more than twice as fast as the movement of cholesterol itself.
