= Carlos Ameghino =

Argentine paleontologist and explorer (1865–1936)

Carlos C. Ameghino
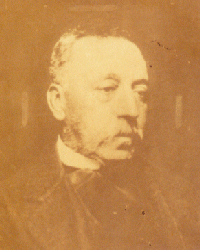
- Born: June 16, 1865; Luján, Argentina
- Died: April 12, 1935 (aged 69); Buenos Aires, Argentin
- Occupation: Paleontologist

Carlos Ciriaco Ameghino (16 June 1865 – 12 April 1936) was an Argentine paleontologist and explorer who accompanied his brother Florentino Ameghino throughout Argentina searching for fossils.

== Scientific career ==
Carlos Ameghino was educated as a naturalist with his brother Florentino Ameghino on his journeys to Buenos Aires and the Chaco Province in Argentina. The goal of this expedition was to collect fossils.

In 1887, he decided to explore South Argentina, and the watersheds of the Santa Cruz River, the Chubut River, the Chico River, the Deseado River, the Gallegos River, and the Straits of Magellan. He discovered many fossils and created several geological and paleontological reports in his research that he gave to his brother. He also demonstrated the exact superposition of two great tertiary formations.

His travels resulted in "Geological Exploration in Patagonia" published in 1890 and "Annals of the Argentine Scientific Society" in 1903.

Throughout his life he also published "Anthropological and geological research in the southern maritime coast of the province of Buenos Aires" together with Luis Maria Torres in 1913, "El fémur de Miramar. Further proof of the presence of the man in the Tertiary of the Argentine Republic "in 1915,"Two new species of toxodonts" in 1917, "The archaeologic and osteolytic sites of Miramar; The question of tertiary man in Argentina, summary of the main facts after the death of Florentino Ameghino" published in 1918 and "Description of the Megatherium gallardoi C. Amegh. discovered in the lower Pampas of the city of Buenos Aires" together with Lucas Kraglievich.

In addition, he not only dedicated himself to fossils of mammals, but also organized a collection of fossils of mollusks, made a herbarium for Dr. Carlos Spegazzini and a paleobotanical sample for Federico Kurtz. He also collected information on the different languages of the Pampas and Patagonian indigenous people, which was later used by Dr. Roberto Lehmann-Nitsche.

When his brother died in 1911, Carlos took over the Vertebrate Paleontology section of the Museum of Natural Sciences of Buenos Aires, until 1917 when he took over as director of the museum, until 1923.

== Death ==
He died in Buenos Aires in 1936.
