= Margaret McKelvy Bird =

American socialite and archaeologist

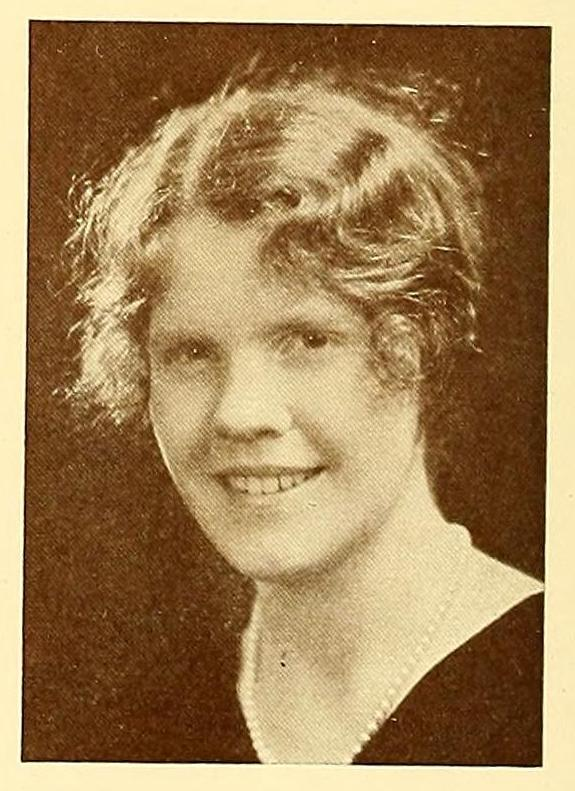
- Margaret McKelvy in the Bryn Mawr College Yearbook, 1931
- Born: August 25, 1909
- Died: December 28, 1996 (aged 87)
- Education: Bryn Mawr College
- Occupation: Archaeologist
- Spouse: Junius Bird
- Children: 3

Margaret (Peggy) McKelvy Bird (25 August 1909 – 28 December 1996) was an American socialite and archaeologist who, with her husband and partner Junius Bird, undertook significant international expeditions. She volunteered at the American Museum of Natural History for over 60 years, where she catalogued and managed the collections they had gathered.

== Early life ==
Margaret McKelvy was born in New York, the daughter of Florence Gloninger Orth and Robert McKelvy, vice president of the Tidewater Oil Company (founded by his father). She attended Brearley School, followed by St. Timothy's School, and Bryn Mawr College, graduating in 1931.

McKelvy met archaeologist Junius Bird in 1931, and the pair married in 1934. They went on to have three sons: Robert McKelvy, Harry Bouton, and Thomas Lee. Upon their marriage, the couple travelled to Hopedale, Labrador, where Junius Bird was undertaking archaeological work.

== Career ==
Following their time in Labrador, the Birds travelled to Southern Chile. Writing to the Bryn Mawr Alumnae Bulletin in 1935, Margaret's mother reported:

My daughter, Margaret McKelvy Bird, is in Southern Chile with her husband, Junius Bird, both being sent to do archaeological work by the American Museum of Natural History — to be away two years. They left on the 9th of November. They have their own sailing boat on which an engine has been installed, which they bought at a port south of Valparaiso. They are cruising among the islands in the inland waters — expecting to reach Magellanes very soon, — their objective being to discover remnants of the earliest civilization in that part of South America.

This was the beginning of a lifelong partnership in archaeological work, during which Margaret went from observer and supporter to active planner and participant. Gordon Willey wrote in a biographical sketch of Junius Bird that Margaret "proved herself a formidable ally right from the start, flourishing under the conditions of a 1,300-mile trip in a nineteen-foot sailboat as well as journeying across the flats of far southern South America in a wind-driven Ford car." Additionally, she kept detailed field journals on the couple's expeditions, her "witty, charming, and personable" writings conveying "the more human aspects of [Junius] Bird’s research while reinterpreting his theoretical ideas."

With Junius Bird, Margaret worked on excavations in Argentina, Patagonia, Peru, and Chile, including at Canadon Leon, Cueva Fell and Pali-Aike.

== Later years ==
Junius Bird died in 1982 at the age of 74. Margaret McKelvy Bird died on 28 December 1996, and was buried with her husband in Greenwood Union Cemetery, Westchester County, New York.
