= Ana Lake =

Lake in Chile

- Location within Southern Patagonia Location within Chile Location within Argentina Location within South America
- Interactive map of Ana Lake
- Location: San Gregorio, Magallanes Region, Chile.
- Coordinates: 52°4′0″S 69°47′30″W
- Basin countries: Chile

Ana Lake is a Patagonian lake in the Pali-Aike National Park, San Gregorio, Magallanes Region, Chile.

== Fauna ==
Birders frequent this locale to spot the least seedsnipe (Thinocorus rumicivorus), and other avafauna. Lago Ana is situated a few kilometres north of the Pali Aike Crater, a location from which archaeological recovery has evinced evidence of early prehistoric man in this region.

== Lake in Canada ==
Also Ana Lake is a lake in Ontario, Canada with Geographical coordinates 45°44'16" North and 79°02'24" West.

== See also ==
- Cueva Fell
