= Bird Homestead =

Historic house in New York, United States

- U.S. National Register of Historic Places
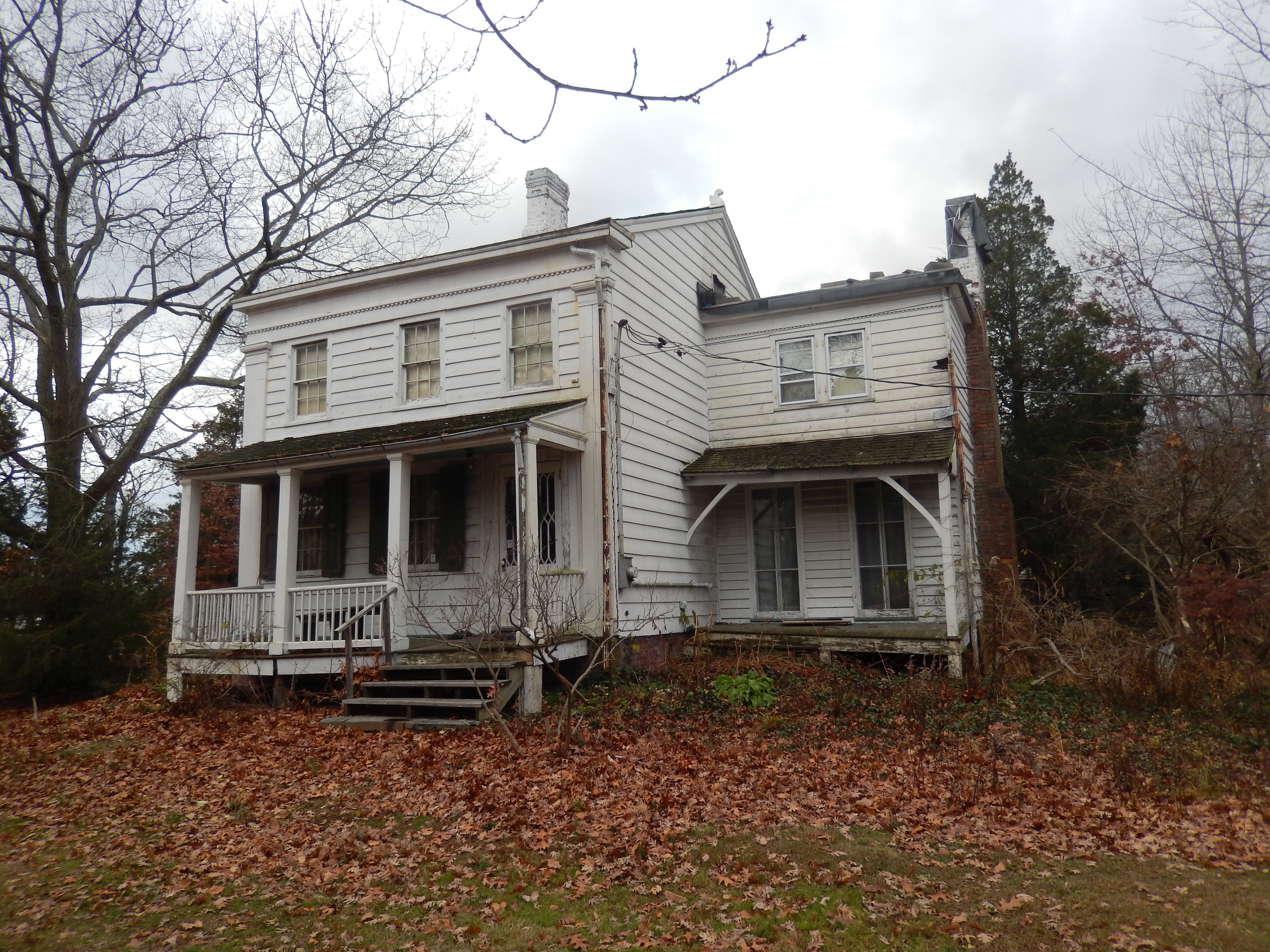

- Location within New York Location within the United States
- Location: 600 Milton Rd., Rye, New York
- Coordinates: 40°57′41″N 73°41′21″W
- Area: 1.2 acres (0.49 ha)
- Built: 1835
- Architectural style: Greek Revival
- NRHP reference No.: 10000032
- Added to NRHP: February 22, 2010

Bird Homestead, also known as the Bouton-Bird-Erikson Homestead, is a historic home and farm complex located in Rye, Westchester County, New York. It is owned by the city of Rye and was purchased in 2009. The property is situated on Blind Brook estuary, off the Long Island Sound. The property is adjacent to the Rye Meeting House. The main part of the house was built in 1835, and is a two-story, three-bay wide frame building in the Greek Revival style. It sits on a brick foundation and has a low-pitched, side gable roof. It features a one-story, full-width, front porch. Also on the property are a contributing two-story barn built in the 1880s and a long, one-story outbuilding.

It was added to the National Register of Historic Places in 2010. It is operated along with the adjacent Rye Meeting House, by the not-for-profit Committee to Save the Bird Homestead.

The home was owned by five generations of the Bouton-Bird-Erikson family for over 150 years. Henry Bird was renowned entomologist; his sons Roland and Junius were pioneers in the fields of paleontology and archaeology, respectively. Many of their discoveries can be seen at the American Museum of Natural History. Henry's daughter Alice Bird Erikson was an accomplished nature illustrator while Doris Bird spent more than forty years as the children's librarian at the Rye Free Reading Room.

== See also ==
- National Register of Historic Places listings in southern Westchester County, New York
