= Cueva Fell =

Cave and archaeological site in Patagonia

- Río Chico shelter
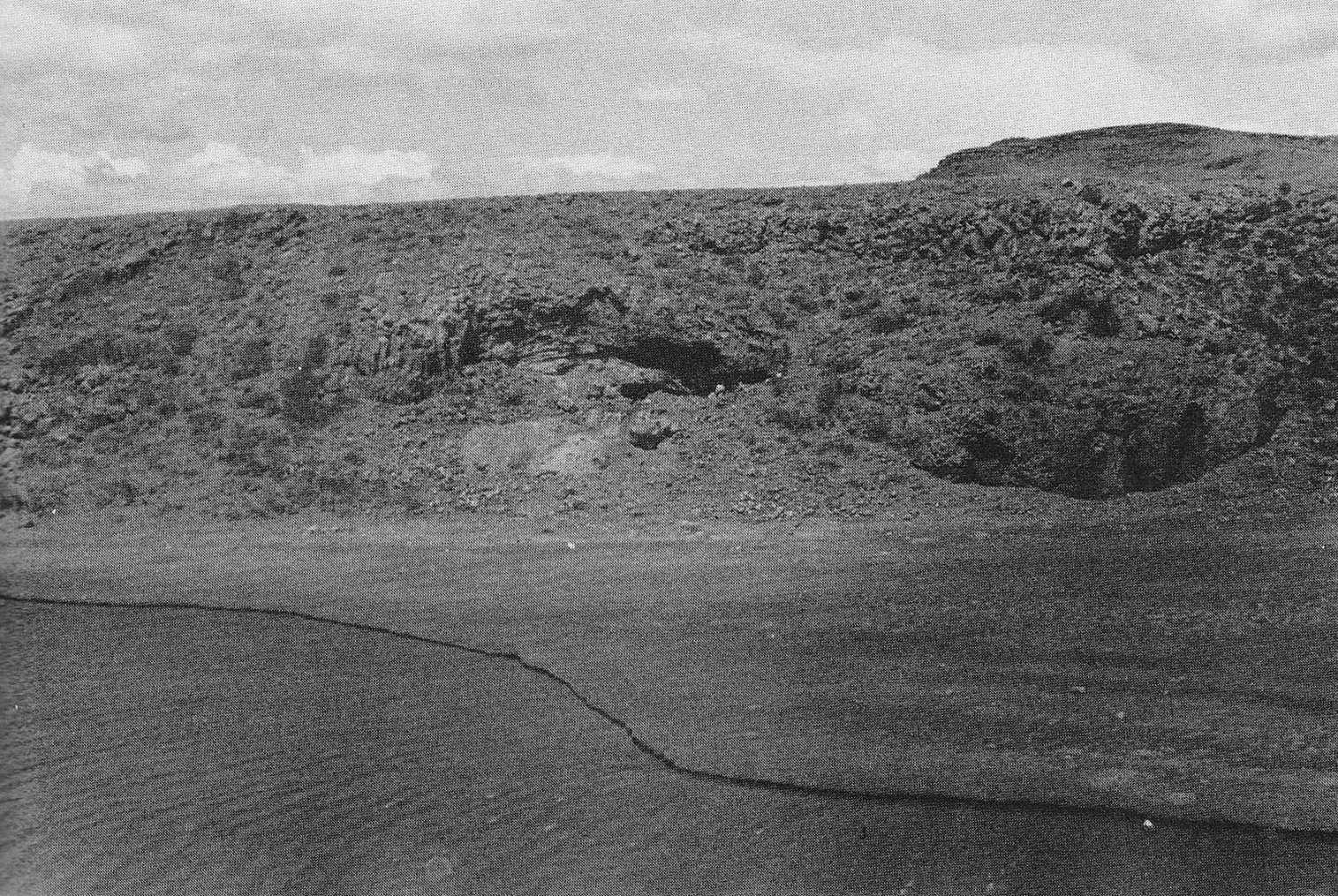
- Cueva Fell as seen from across the Chico River

- location in Tierra del Fuego location in Chile
- 52°02′S 70°03′W
- Periods: Neolithic
- Location: Chico, Gallegos
- Region: Patagonia, Chile

History
- Built: Early Holocene,

Site notes
- Archaeologists: Junius Bird; John Fell

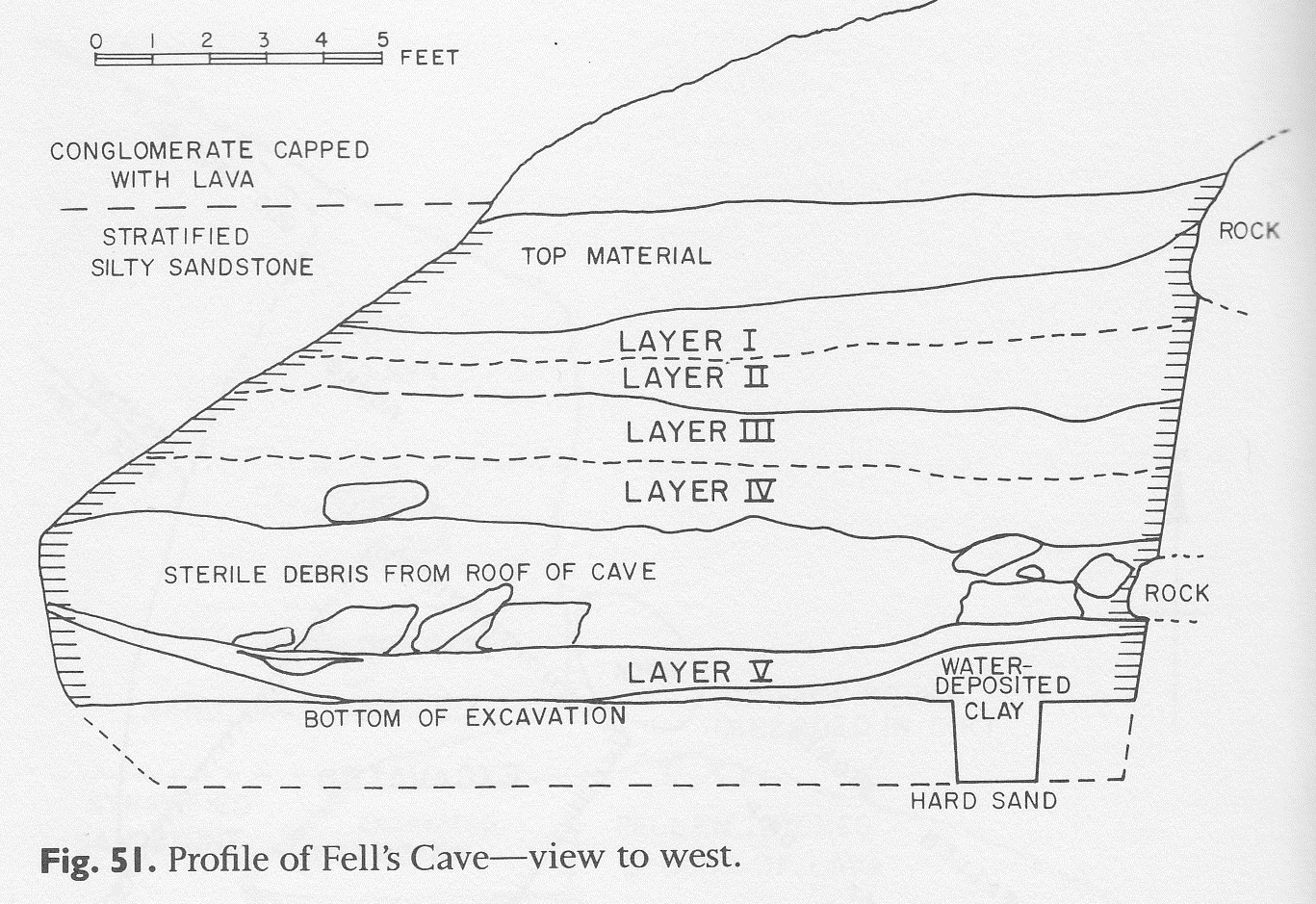
Cueva Fell's stratigraphy

Cueva Fell or Fell's Cave is a natural cave and archaeological site in southern Patagonia. Cueva Fell is in proximity to the Pali Aike Crater, another significant archaeological site. Cueva Fell combined with the nearby Pali Aike site have been submitted to UNESCO as a possible World Heritage Site.

== Site discovery ==
Fell's Cave was discovered by Junius Bird. It came to his attention because arrow points and flakes were found on the surface. The cave was originally called the Río Chico shelter, but was later renamed by Bird to Fell's Cave in honor of the Fell family who owned the Estancia Brazo Norte, the North Arm Station, where the cave is located. Excavation of the site began in 1936.

== Site formation ==
Fell's Cave is located in the Río Chico canyon, Chile, near the Straits of Magellan and the Argentine border. This area is known as the Southern Patagonian Basalt Plateaus. Situated on the southeast side of what was once a river bank, it is more accurately described as a rock shelter. It was formed by river water wearing away at the sandstone bank, leaving behind a canopy of lava conglomerate and thus creating a shelter 28 ft (8.5 m) deep and 38 ft (12 m) wide. The erosion formed a smooth floor of hard clay. Remnants of sandstone still clinging to the conglomerate roof eventually fell to the floor, forming an archaeologically sterile layer that separated later human occupation periods.

== Stratigraphy ==
Junius Bird labelled the occupational sediment layers of the site from top to bottom, the top layer directly under the surface is I and the oldest, lowest layer is V.

Surface

The surface material of the site is composed of dirt, rocks, and hard-packed sheep manure. The surface layer ranges from 18 to 24 in (46 to 61 cm) in thickness.

Layer I

The youngest stratigraphic layer of Fell's Cave is a dark earth layer, reaching approximately 10 in (25 cm) in thickness. This component dates from around 700 years BP to the present. According to conventional radiocarbon dating, the layer dates to 1265 CE +-90.

Layer II

The division between Layer I and Layer II is relatively indistinguishable as the sediments are of similar dark earth, and also reach about 10 in (25 cm) or more in thickness. This layer dates to around 6,500 years BP.

Layer III

This layer dates to around 8,500 to 6,500 years BP. The earth consistency between Layers II and III marking a notable distinction between the two. Layer III is approximately 12 to 15 in (30 to 38 cm) thick and consists of compacted dark earth.

Layer IV

The thickness of this layer varies from 13 to 17 in (33 to 43 cm) and consists of firmly packed dark earth. This layer dates from c. 10,000 to 8,500 years BP.

Sterile Layer

After the earliest layer, Layer V, had accumulated, sandstone slabs fell from the roof of the cave and sealed it off. This layer is 15 to 20 in (38 to 51 cm) thick.

Layer V

A refuse soft clay soil varying in thickness from 3 to 9 in (7.6 to 22.9 cm) composes the oldest occupation level at the site. The site dates from 11,000 +-170 years BP to 10,080 +-160 years BP according to conventional radiocarbon dating.

== Chronology ==
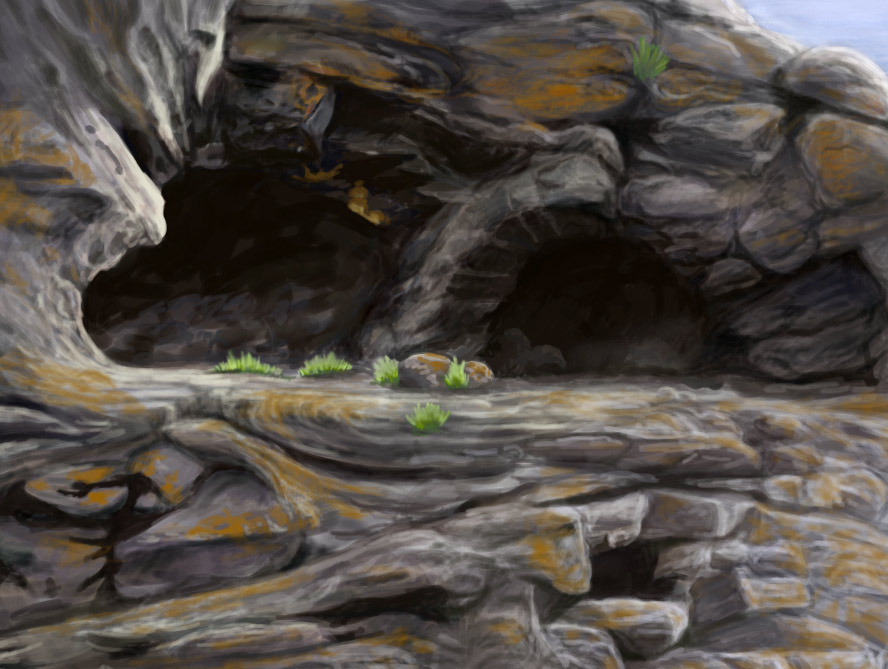
Artist's rendition of Cueva Fell exterior

Bird named the periods from earliest to latest, thus Period I is the oldest and is associated with Layer V, while Period V is the latest and is associated with Layer I.

Period V

This period (layer I) is typified by a tool assemblage containing small arrow points and various bone tools, as well as such cultural materials as combs and beads. Based on the style of the arrow points, it is likely that this period is associated with the Ona Indians. The faunal assemblage of this period is dominated by guanaco bone fragments.

Period IV

Period IV is characterized by the presence of stone tools such as stemmed or legged stone points, knives, and small thumb-nail scrapers as well as a bone tool assemblage. Large bolas, various beads and other ornaments are also present. This Period can also be distinguished by the building of structures including extended burials and rock cairns. Again, the faunal assemblage is dominated by guanaco.

Period III

Present in this layer are bone awls, stone scrapers, and triangular stone points with rounded bases. Also, bolas of notably smaller size than the subsequent later period, period IV. It has been suggested that these small stone bolas may have been used in procurement of birds. Guanaco and fox bone fragments dominate the faunal assemblage.

Period II

This layers consists mainly of bone points and awls, and stone scrapers. Junius Bird notes in Travels and Archaeology in South Chile that this layer contained significantly more sediment in relation to artifact distribution.

Period I

The oldest cultural occupation at this site belongs to the Fell's Tradition. Thus, Fell's Cave is the type site for the Fell's Tradition. This tradition is characterized most notably by fishtail points as well as various stone scrapers, choppers, stone discs and bone tools. Several hearths were also excavated from this level which produced three radiocarbon dates between c.11,000 and 10,000 years BP.

== Ecology ==
=== Climate ===
In the Late Pleistocene, prior to 12,500 years BP, the area surrounding Cueva Fell was dominated by high winds, year-round freezing temperatures, and annual precipitation under 300 mm. This heathland environment was replaced by a treeless, xeric, herbaceous steppe environment through 11,000 years BP, as the freezing temperatures and winds began to abate. This is the climate and terrain that most closely predated the first human inhabitants in the area.

The earliest human occupation dates suggested by the finds in Layer V—c. 11,000 to 10,000 years BP correspond to a period of stadial cooling. In what has been described as a possible South American equivalent to the Younger Dryas, the Patagonian region experienced a period of low temperatures and high precipitation as well as advancing glaciers. This was followed in 10,000 to 9,000 years BP by a warming trend. These two thousand years in question marked a fitful end to the last ice age, one marked by high environmental variability. While this produced significant changes in some taxa, humans, at this time, were already becoming adept at adjusting to new environments and appear not to have been deleteriously affected by the changeable and unpredictable climate.

As the Holocene warming trend persisted, so the environment of southern Patagonia continued to change. The archaeology of Fell's Cave provides evidence for the regular occurrence of summer droughts in the area—droughts that, combined with increasing summer storm activity, may have led to wildfires. The decrease in water availability combined with the evident (through pollen analysis) dramatic change in grazing flora species, are proposed as contributing factors to the evident faunal extinction.

The period of 9,000 to 6,000 years BP saw less remarkable shifts in climate, with a general trend away from xeric taxa and, it is then presumed, an increase in precipitation. There is insufficient radiocarbon control at the site to determine local climate conditions post-6,000 years BP, however regional ecology suggests a slight shift towards more aridity.

Today Cueva Fell joins most of southern Argentina in what is known as the Fuego-Patagonia steppe environment. The area receives less than 400 mm (16 in) annual precipitation (typical for the Patagonia region but much drier than neighbouring coastal or mountain terrains) and is dominated by bunch grasses from the genera Festuca and Stipa, along with a variety of herbaceous vegetation.

=== Flora & fauna ===
Cueva Fell is notable for the range of now-extinct faunal finds excavated from within it. Notable among these are the giant sloth and the horse. The horse was to become extinct and absent in the Americas through most of the Holocene until it was imported by Europeans. In fact the evidence of the ancient horse Cueva Fell was the first proof that horses occupied the Americas before being reintroduced from the Old World. The stratified remains of both human and animals provides evidence that human occupation of the area actually preceded the extinction of both the native horse (Hippidion saldiasi) and the ground sloth Mylodon. This same evidence suggested that ancient horse was hunted and eaten. However humans weren't the sole predators in the area. Bone remains of the horse, llama and ground sloth all display puncture marks, most likely made by the Patagonia panther.

The Early Holocene taxa change—the extinction of mostly herbivorous animals in South America—was initially attributed to human over-hunting, as were the megafaunal extinctions in North America. Analysis of pollen extracted from Cueva Fell suggested a substantial reduction in grassland in southern Patagonia in the period just preceding these extinctions, and was an early piece of evidence in the mounting argument against hunting as the primary cause of species collapse. Large quantities of guanaco (lama) were also found in the older depositional layers. Where other large grazing fauna died out in the early Holocene, guanaco appear to have survived as a result of their less specialized plant diet, adapting to the change in vegetation that accompanied the warming Holocene. Guanaco population sizes initially dipped along with other grazing species, but eventually recovered.

Analysis of canine remains found in all five human occupation levels of the cave initially suggested they were those of domestic dog (Canis familiaris). This would have been remarkable as the earliest evidence for the domestic dog in the Americas. However subsequent analyses suggest the skull and teeth remains to have been from two wild species: Pseudalopex griseus (South American gray fox) and Canis avus (a small fox or wolf-life canine, particular to South America in the late Pleistocene period). Other faunal bone remains include hawks and falcons.

== Artifacts ==
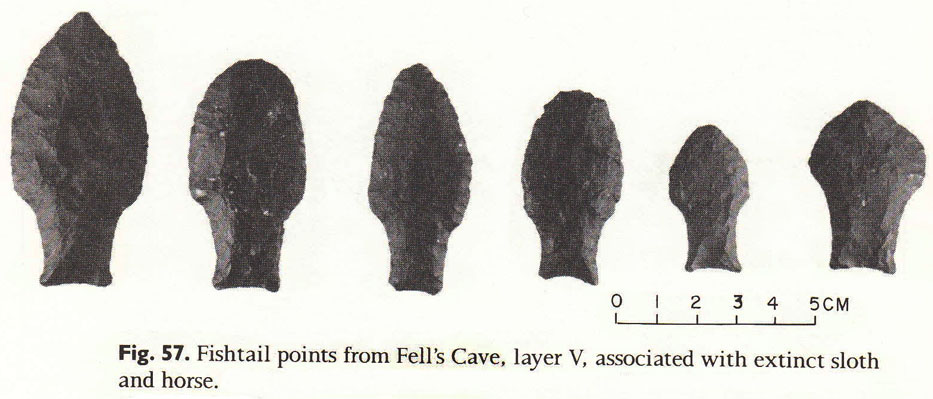
Fishtail projectile points recovered from Cueva Fell by Junius Bird in the 1930s

The first excavation of Fell's cave in 1936 yielded 511 artefacts. These included hafted implements, knives, scrapers, bolas, a couple of circular rubbing stones, and bone tools.

Distribution of artefacts from Fell's Cave (1936)
Group	Category	Surface layer	Layer I	Layer II	Layer III	Layer IV	Layer V	Total
Hafted implements	Ona-type arrow point	-	13	2	-	-	-	15
Hafted implements	Patagonian-type arrow point	1	11	5	1	-	-	18
Hafted implements	Small, triangular arrow point	-	2	-	1	-	-	3
Hafted implements	Small, rudimentary stem	-	1	-	-	-	-	1
Hafted implements	Old-type, triangular point	-	-	2	20	2	-	24
Hafted implements	Triangular, concave base	-	1	1	2	-	1	5
Hafted implements	Fishtail point	-	-	-	-	-	15	15
Hafted implements	Hafted knife	-	12	5	2	-	-	19
Hafted implements	Hafted knife, questionable	-	5	2	-	-	-	7
Knives	Thin, single-edge	-	1	-	2	-	-	3
Knives	3-sided	-	-	possibly 2	1	1	-	4
Knives	?, concave base, broad, thin	-	-	1	-	-	-	1
Knives	Fragment (uncertain)	-	-	-	-	-	3	3
Knives	Combination knife-scraper	-	-	1	2	-	-	3
Scrapers	Single-edge, rough flake	11	45	59	36	25	26	202
Scrapers	2-edge, large	3	2	2	-	2	1	10
Scrapers	2-edge, narrow	-	4	11	1	6	-	22
Scrapers	2 points	-	-	-	-	-	2	2
Scrapers	Large, rough, circular edge	-	-	1	2	2	6	11
Scrapers	Reversed-edge	-	1	-	-	-	1	2
Scrapers	End	-	-	-	-	-	6	6
Scrapers	Small, hafted	13	26	51	9	-	-	99
Scrapers	Unfinished blank	-	1	-	6	1	-	8
Bolas	Deep groove, flat ends	-	1	-	-	-	-	1
Bolas	Unfinished	-	-	-	1	-	-	1
Bolas	Spherical, fragment	-	1	-	-	-	-	1
Bolas	Lemon-shaped, fragment	-	-	1	-	-	-	1
	Circular rubbing stone	-	-	-	-	-	2	2
Bone implements	Chipping tool	-	12	6	-	-	-	18
Bone implements	Bird bone awl	-	-	1	-	-	-	1
Bone implements	Solid bone awl	-	1	-	-	-	-	1
Bone implements	Lance point	-	-	-	-	1	-	1
Bone implements	Bead	-	1	-	-	-	-	1
	Totals	28	141	153	86	40	63	511

Perhaps the most significant find in the 1936 excavation was the fishtail projectile point. All of the fishtail points were associated with large mammals including: extinct horses, giant ground sloths, and guanacos. Fifteen fishtail projectile points were recovered from Layer V which is the oldest layer that dates back to 11,000 +-170 and 10,080 +-160 years BP. These fishtail point have been radiocarbon dated to be ca. 11,000 years old.

Discoidal stones, referred in the chart as circular rubbing stones, were also found. Bird notes in a 1970 journal article that "stone artefacts shaped by pecking and grinding are so generally absent among Paleo-Indian finds that exceptions are noteworthy". There were two stones found in Cueva Fell; both of them were clearly associated with animal remains. Both were made from lava. The larger stone has a diameter of about 12.3 cm (4.8 in) and weighs about 1.12 kg (2.5 lb) while the smaller stone is about 8.4 cm (3.3 in) in diameter and weighs about 0.5 kg (1.1 lb). There was also a substantial amount of scrapers found throughout all the Cueva Fell layers. The bone tools found, according to Bird, were made from sloth bone because there bone used showed no evidence of marrow cavities.

In 1969 there was a second dig organized at Cueva Fell but it was focused in a slightly different location of the cave. During this excavation 415 artifacts were found; various points, knives, scrapers, cores, bolas, and bone tools.

Artefacts from Fell's Cave excavated in 1969 and 1970
Group	Category	Area D	Area C and D	Total
Points	Ona, small, barbed	9	-	9
Points	Small, triangular	1	-	1
Points	Unidentified, fragment	1	-	1
Points	Patagonian, stemmed	7	9	16
Points	Spear	1	1	2
Points	Old-type, stemless, triangular	-	16	16
Points	Fishtail	-	1	1
Knives	Hafted	1	-	1
Knives	Knife or spear	-	2	2
Knives	Small, leaf-shaped	-	1	1
Knives	Single edge (from flake)	2	3	5
Knives	3-edge	-	2	2
Knives	Combination knife-scraper	1	2	3
Scrapers	Rough, single-edge flake	26	103	129
Scrapers	2-edge, large	2	13	15
Scrapers	2-edge, narrow (parallel)	1	1	2
Scrapers	2 points	1	-	1
Scrapers	2 sides to point	1	4	5
Scrapers	1-edge (like 2-edge)	31	47	78
Scrapers	1-sided, rounded end	-	5	5
Scrapers	Large, circular	-	12	12
Scrapers	End	3	8	11
Scrapers	Reversed 2-edge	1	-	1
Scrapers	Hafted	32	23	55
Scrapers	Fragment, uncertain, misc.	2	9	11
Scrapers	Blank	-	9	9
	Cores	1	4	5
	Bolas	1	3	4
Bone tools	Chipping tool	2	1	3
Bone tools	Bird bone awl	-	3	3
Bone tools	Solid point awl	1	1	2
Bone tools	Bonce lance point	-	3	3
Bone tools	Spear thrower contact point	-	1	1
	Total	130	285	415

== Site significance ==
=== The colonization of the New World ===
The colonization of the Americas may be one of the most contentious archaeological debates today. The issue involves a large body of research and numerous theories as to how and when this event began. For decades, the Clovis-first model trumped all other theories for the Settlement of the Americas. This theory basically holds that the Clovis culture constituted the earliest peoples to arrive in and inhabit North America. Entering the Americas from Asia via the Bering Land Bridge and migrating south through the ice free corridor, the Clovis people populated southern North America. This population spread through Central America and finally South America.

At the time the theory was proposed no archaeological evidence had been discovered in the Americas which pre-dated 11,050 to 10,800 years BP, or the onset of the Clovis culture. However, in the last few decades a multitude of sites were found, which at first challenged this theory and now demand a new model to explain the peopling of the Americas. Based on the current understanding of archaeological evidence, it is now widely accepted that a pre-Clovis culture colonized the Americas via a Pacific coastal route sometime between 14,000 and 12,000 years BP.

Some of the evidence supporting the coastal theory comes from the southernmost portions of South America. Many researchers now agree that occupation of Tierra del Fuego, between 11,000 and 10,500 years ago, simply does not provide enough time for mid-continental migration. A similar argument is made about Monte Verde, which may be the best known and most widely accepted of these sites and which pre-dates Clovis by approximately 1,000 years.

Although site discovery and excavation were not recent, Cueva Fell is representative of occupation of southern South America. The earliest occupation at Cueva Fell, between 11,000 +-170 and 10,080 +-160 years BP, does not pre-date but is coeval with Clovis. Other Late Pleistocene sites in Argentina, such as Cerro Tres Tetas, Cueva Casa del Minero and Piedra Museo are also contemporaneous with Clovis and the early occupation at Fell's Cave.

=== Stone tool technology ===
The common tendency to compare South American and North American prehistory is increasingly becoming outmoded, most notably in regards to early technological adaptations. It has been long believed that the early fluted points of South America represented a diffusion of the fluted North American Clovis points. South American fluted points include the fishtail point represented at Cueva Fell and many other regions, the El Jobo point (Venezuela), and the Paijan point (Peru and Ecuador), all of which dating to Clovis times.

The fluted stone tool variants of South America represent regional adaptations to the procurement of Pleistocene megafauna that contrasts with the continent-wide use of Clovis points in North America. Such regional technological adaptations seem to reflect the initial dispersal of small paleoindian groups throughout the vast continent. The fishtail points of Cueva Fell thus represent crucial evidence in the distinction between tool technologies in the southern and northern continents of the Americas.

=== Site discovery in Fuego-Patagonia ===
Finally, Cueva Fell deserves recognition for representing possibly the earliest occupation of Fuego-Patagonia approximately 11,000 BP. This southern region of South America is symbolic of "the end of the line" for the initial colonization of the New World.

The early inhabitants of Fuego-Patagonia signify sparse populations spread out over large territories and chances of site discovery in this region are low. Compounding the low likelihood of site discovery in this region is the deeply buried contexts associated with such early occupation and the subsequent increase of various perturbation processes threatening the archaeological integrity. Many of these sites, Cueva Fell included, are rock shelters which have been used as dens by carnivorous fauna over thousands of years, which not only disturb archaeological deposits but add difficulty to recognizing archaeological sites. Low population density combined with these other factors make Junius Bird's discovery of Cueva Fell in 1936 truly remarkable in and of itself.

== See also ==
- Lago Ana
- Pali-Aike National Park
- Cueva de las Manos

== Bibliography ==
- Bird, Junius B. (1970). "Paleo-Indian Discoidal stones from Southern South America". American Antiquity. 35 (2): 205–209. doi:10.2307/278152. ISSN 0002-7316. JSTOR 278152. S2CID 162317721.
- Bird, Junius B. (1988). Travels and Archaeology in South Chile. University of Iowa Press. pp. 1–246. ISBN 0-87745-202-4.
- Borrero, Luis Alberto; Franco, Nora Viviana (1997). "Early Patagonia Hunter-Gatherers: Subsistence and Technology". Journal of Anthropological Research. 53 (2): 219–239. doi:10.1086/jar.53.2.3631277. JSTOR 3631277. S2CID 87160252.
- Borrero, Luis (1999). "Human dispersal and climatic conditions during Late Pleistocene times in Fuego-Patagonia". Quaternary International. 53 (54): 93–99. doi:10.1016/s1040-6182(98)00010-x. JSTOR 25801146.
- Clutton-Brock, Juliet (1988). "The Carnivore Remains Excavated at Fell's Cave in 1970". In Bird, Junius B. (ed.). Travels and Archaeology in South Chile. University of Iowa Press. pp. 188–195. ISBN 0-87745-202-4.
- Dillehay, Tom D.; Calderon, Gerardo Ardila; Politis, Gustavo (1992). "Earliest hunters and gatherers of South America". Journal of World Prehistory. 6 (2): 145–204. doi:10.1007/BF00975549. JSTOR 25800613. S2CID 162353211.
- Dillehay (1999). "The late Pleistocene cultures of South America". Evolutionary Anthropology. 7 (6): 206–216. doi:10.1002/(sici)1520-6505(1999)7:6<206::aid-evan5>3.0.co;2-g. S2CID 38851483.
- Gnecco, Cristóbal; Aceituno, Javier (2006). "Early Humanized Landscapes in Northern South America". In Morrow, Juliet E.; Gnecco, Cristóbal (eds.). Paleoindian Archaeology: A Hemisphere Perspective. University Press of Florida. pp. 86–104. ISBN 0-8130-3389-6.
- Heusser, Calvin J. (2003). Ice Age Southern Andes: A Chronicle of Paleoecological Events. Elsevier. pp. 1–240. ISBN 0-444-51478-3.
- Jackson, Lawrence J. (2006). "Fluted and Fishtail Points from Southern Coastal Chile: New Evidence Suggesting Clovis- and Folsom-Related Occupations in Southernmost South America". In Morrow, Juliet E.; Gnecco, Cristóbal (eds.). Paleoindian Archaeology: A Hemisphere Perspective. University Press of Florida. pp. 105–120. ISBN 0-8130-3389-6.
- Markgraf, Vera (1988). "11,000 Years of Changes in Paleoenvironments, Fauna, and Human Occupation". In Bird, Junius B. (ed.). Travels and Archaeology in South Chile. University of Iowa Press. pp. 196–201. ISBN 0-87745-202-4.
- Markgraf, Vera (1993). "Paleoenvironments and paleoclimates in Tierra del Fuego and southernmost Patagonia, South America". Palaeogeography, Palaeoclimatology, Palaeoecology. 102 (1–2): 53–68. doi:10.1016/0031-0182(93)90005-4.
- Paez, M.M.; Prieto, A.R.; Mancini, M.V. (1999). "Fossil pollen from Los Toldos locality: A record of the Late-glacial transition in the Extra-Andean Patagonia". Quaternary International. 53–54: 69–75. doi:10.1016/S1040-6182(98)00008-1.
- Ranere, Anthony J. (2006). "The Clovis Colonization of Central America". In Morrow, Juliet E.; Gnecco, Cristóbal (eds.). Paleoindian Archaeology: A Hemisphere Perspective. University Press of Florida. pp. 69–85. ISBN 0-8130-3389-6.
- Roosevelt, Anna C. (1990). "Travels and Archaeology In South Chile". The Latin American Anthropology Review. 2 (2): 72–74. doi:10.1525/jlca.1990.2.2.72.
- Waters, Michael R. (2007). "Redefining the Age of Clovis: Implications for the Peopling of the Americas". Science. 315 (5815): 1122–1126. doi:10.1126/science.1137166. JSTOR 20039062. PMID 17322060. S2CID 23205379.
- Michael R. Waters, Thomas Amorosi, Thomas W. Stafford, jr.: Redacting Fell's Cave, Chile and the Chronological Placement of the Fishtail Projectile Point. In: American Antiquity, Society for American Archaeology, Volume 80, No. 2 (April 2015), p. 376–386
