= Pali-Aike volcanic field =

Cluster of volcanoes in Argentina and Chile

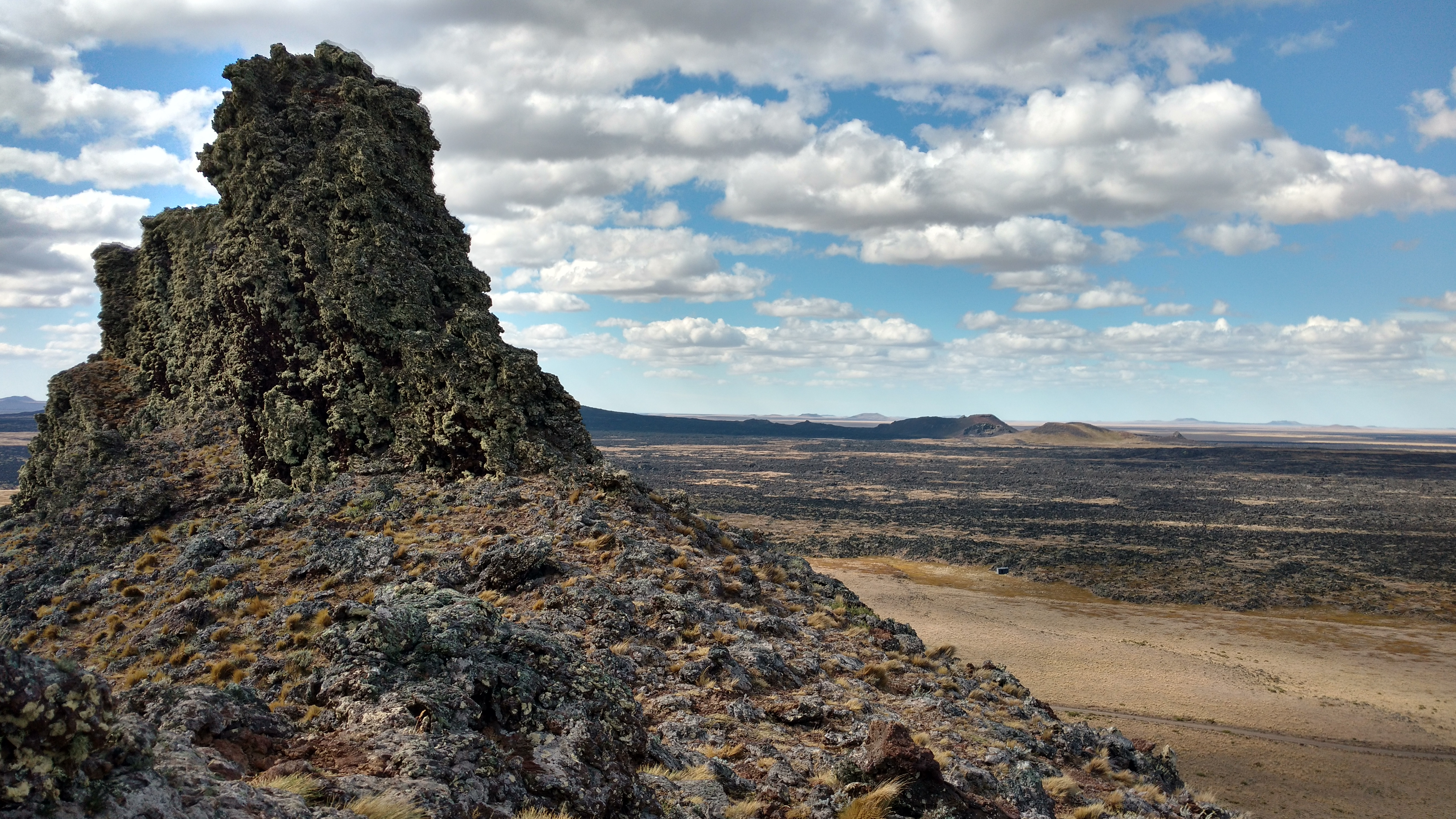
- Pali-Aike

Highest point
- Coordinates: 52.082°S 69.698°W

Geography
- Location within Southern Patagonia

The Pali-Aike volcanic field is a volcanic field along the Argentina–Chile border. It is part of a family of back-arc volcanoes in Patagonia, which formed from processes involving the collision of the Chile Ridge with the Peru–Chile Trench. It lies farther east than the Austral Volcanic Zone, the volcanic arc that makes up the Andean Volcanic Belt at this latitude. Pali-Aike formed over sedimentary rock of Magallanes Basin, a Jurassic-age basin (Note: A basin is a depression between two geologic boundaries caused by a sinking of the crust.) starting from the late Miocene as a consequence of regional tectonic events.

The volcanic field consists of an older plateau basalt formation and younger volcanic centres in the form of pyroclastic cones, (Note: Cones formed by pyroclasts, which are rocks formed during the fragmentation of magma.) scoria cones, (Note: Scoria cones are cones formed by volcanic cinder and pyroclasts, which are rocks formed during the fragmentation of magma.) maars (Note: Maars are explosion craters formed by steam explosions caused by magma-water interactions.) and associated lava flows. There are approximately 467 vents in an area of 4,500 square kilometres (1,700 square miles). The vents often form local alignments along lineaments or faults, and there are a number of maars and other lakes, both volcanic and non-volcanic. The volcanic field is noteworthy for the presence of large amounts of xenoliths (Note: Xenoliths are rocks that are dragged along with magma as it ascends.) in its rocks and because the maar Potrok Aike is located here, where palaeoclimate data have been obtained. The field was active starting from 3.78 million years ago. The latest eruptions occurred during the Holocene, as indicated by the burial of archaeological artifacts; the Laguna Azul maar formed during the Holocene.

Humans have lived in the region for thousands of years, and a number of archaeological sites such as the Fell Cave are located in the field. Presently, parts of the volcanic field are protected areas in Chile and Argentina, and the city of Rio Gallegos in Argentina is within 23 kilometres (14 mi) of the volcanic field.

== Name ==
The name Pali-Aike comes from the Tehuelche language, where pale means "hunger" and aike means "location". Originally it was the name of a farm (estancia) and was later applied to the volcanic field.

== Human geography ==
The Pali-Aike volcanic field spans the border between Argentina and Chile, northwest of the Magellanes Strait. Most of the field lies in Argentina within the southernmost part of Santa Cruz Province, while the Chilean part is in the commune of San Gregorio, Chile. The cities of Rio Gallegos (Argentina) and Punta Arenas (Chile) lie northeast and southwest of Pali-Aike respectively. Unusually for Argentine volcanoes, Pali-Aike volcanoes are close to urban areas since the closest vent is only 23 kilometres (14 mi) or 30 kilometres (19 mi) away from Rio Gallegos; the vents are easily observed from the city. The Monte Aymond border pass lies next to the volcanic field and Argentine National Route 3 passes through the Pali-Aike volcanic field. The border crossing Paso Integración Austral lies next to the volcanic field. On the Chilean side there are hiking trails.

== Geography and structure ==
=== Local ===
The Pali-Aike volcanic field covers a surface area of 4,500 square kilometres (1,700 square miles), and extends over 150 kilometres (93 mi) from northwest to southeast. It is formed by a plateau of lava flows that is up to 120 metres (390 ft) thick (in its northwestern reach), with an average relief of 20–100 metres (66–328 ft). This plateau is formed by tables containing depressions and lakes, and whose margins are steep-dipping slopes that accumulate blocks at their feet. It includes remnants of individual volcanic centres, and some volcanic necks situated in the west–central part of the field may be the formerly underground components of now-eroded volcanic edifices. Among these volcanic necks are the Cuadrado, Domeyko, Gay and Philippi hills, which conspicuously stick out of the surrounding plains. The volcanic rocks were emplaced atop Cenozoic- to Tertiary-age sediments, which were smoothened by glacial action. The sediments are often unstable and prone to mass wasting and landslides.

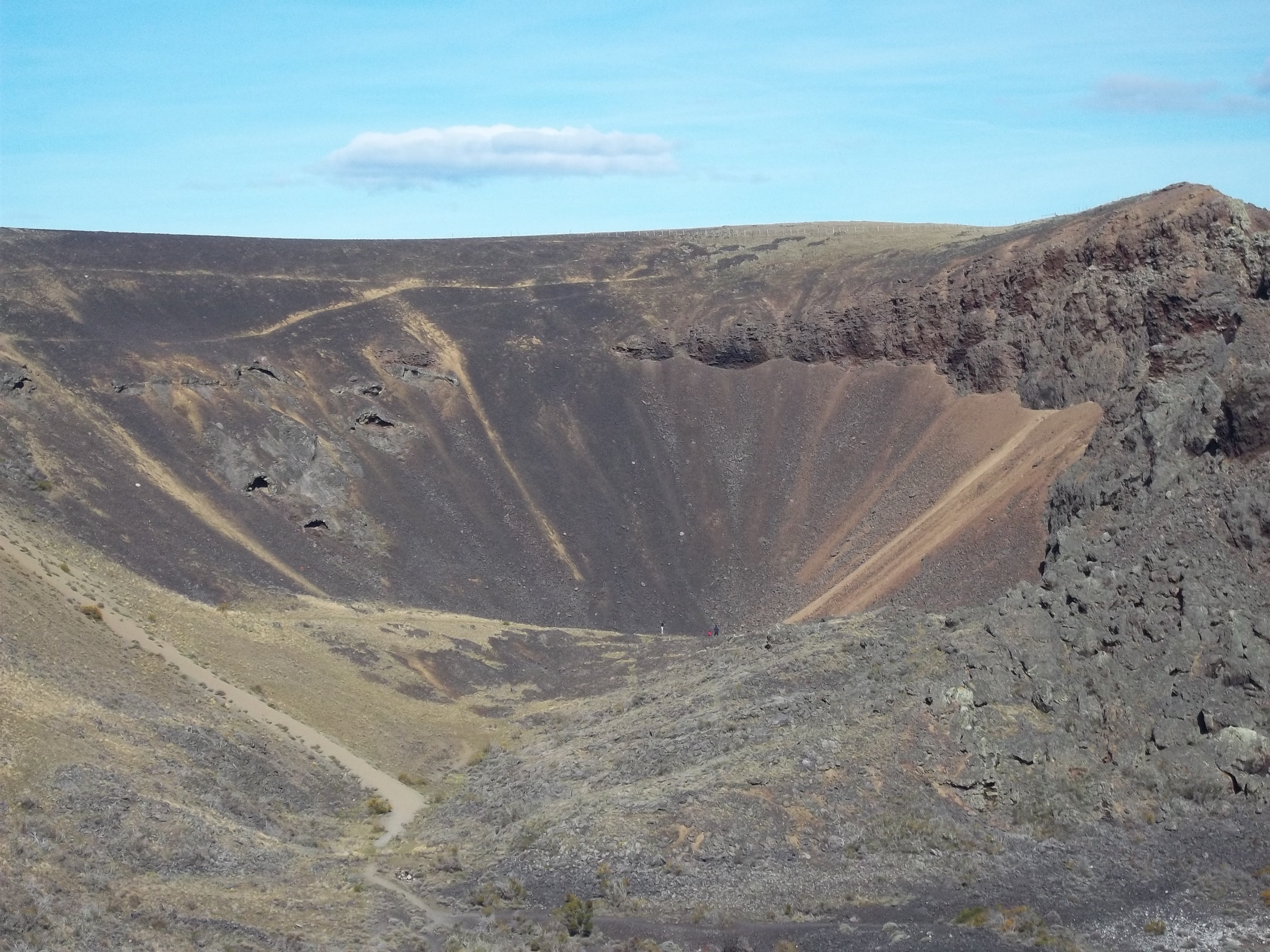
A vent close to Laguna Azul

There are 467 volcanic vents in the field. Monogenetic volcanoes are emplaced on the lava plateau at elevations of 110–180 metres (360–590 ft) above sea level and include maars, tuff rings and scoria cones. These various centres rise between 20–160 metres (66–525 ft) above the surrounding terrain. Nested craters, breached craters and fissure vents are common among the various vents, as are lava flows, but there has been little research on the scoria cones. Lava flows embedded in valleys reach lengths of 8 kilometres (5 mi). Pyroclastic cones in Pali-Aike include Aymond, Colorado, Dinero, Fell and Negro. The vent Cerro del Diablo, a pyroclastic cone, is the youngest volcano in the field and has emitted both ʻaʻā and pahoehoe lava, which have a fresh appearance and no soil cover. The vents were origins of lava flows, which sometimes breached the vents. Some flows are older and covered with soil while younger ones are not. Such young lava flows also have surface features including lava tunnels, hornitos, tumuli and a wrinkled surface. Some of these are heavily eroded while the southeastern part of the field features fresh-looking centres, where they form the "Basaltos del Diablo". The individual volcanoes are subdivided into three groups, which are referred to as "U1" (the plateau lavas), "U2" (the older centres) and "U3" (for the more recent vents).

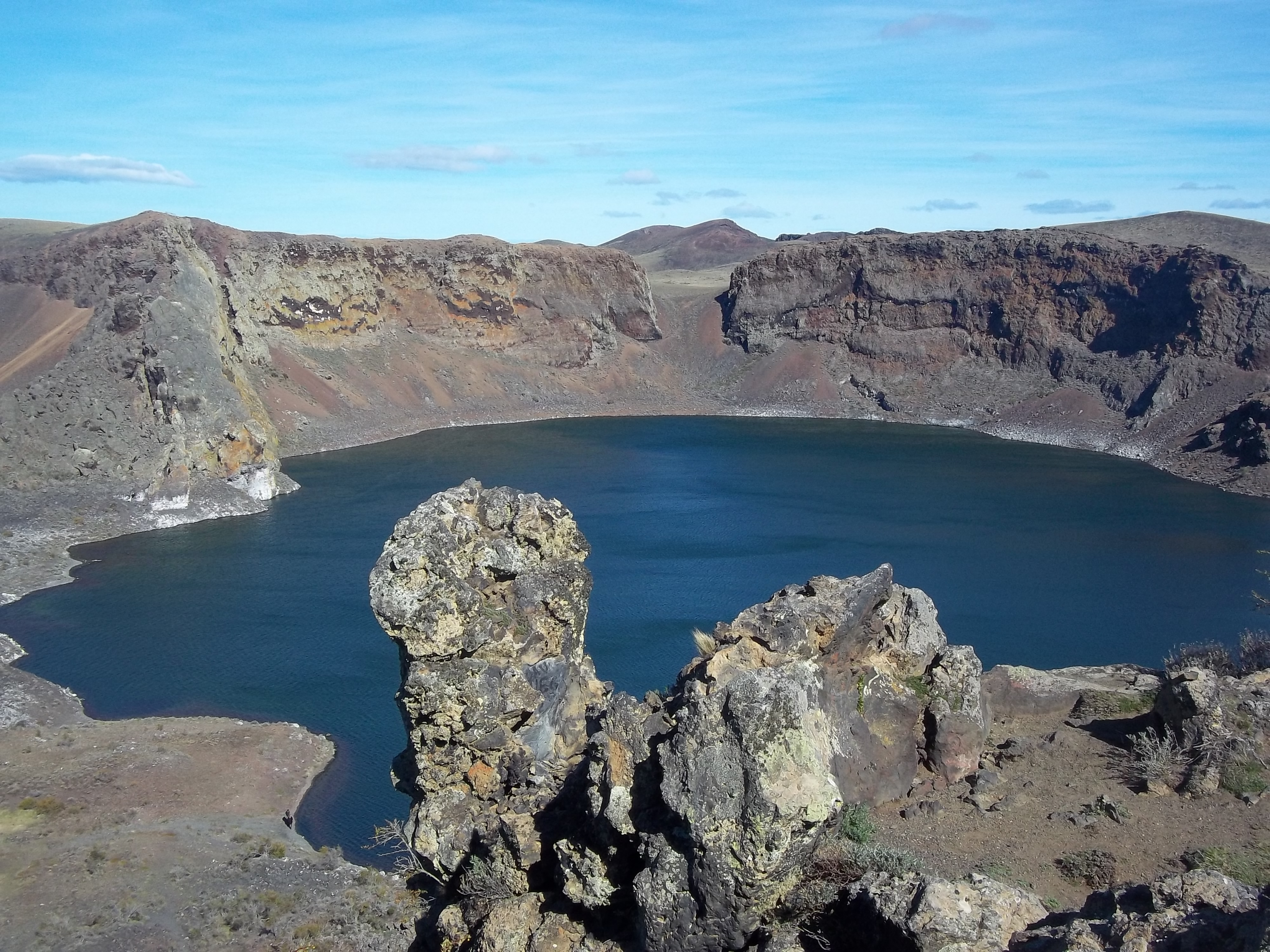
Laguna Azul lake

Maars are depressions in the ground which are encircled by a ring of sediment that rises above the surrounding terrain; they typically form where frozen or liquid water interacts with rising magma and causes explosions. In Pali-Aike there are about 100 of them, with diameters ranging from 500 metres (1,600 ft) to about 4,000 metres (13,000 ft), and they make up the characteristic topography of the volcanic field. The periglacial ground is rich in ice and water, which might explain why there are so many maars in Pali-Aike. Notable among these lakes is Laguna Azul, a crater lake which is located within a pyroclastic ring at the side of a scoria cone. This maar formed during three stages in three separate craters and is also the source of a lava flow. Potrok Aike in comparison is much larger (crater diameter of 5 kilometres (3.1 mi)); its rim is barely recognizable and appears to be more akin to a maar. Laguna Timone is surrounded by a 2 kilometres (1.2 mi) wide tuff ring and is among the largest maars in the Pali-Aike volcanic field, although the lake covers only part of the maar depression. Additional maars in the southwestern part of the field are the so-called "West Maar" and "East Maar", which contain the lakes Laguna Salsa and Laguna del Ruido respectively, Bismarck, Carlota, Los Flamencos and Laguna Salida/Laguna Ana. Apart from maars, there are ephemeral lakes.

A number of vents form various alignments, usually along northwest–southeast and east–northeast–west–southwest lines; some older centres show a north–south pattern. Such alignments occur when local lineations act as a pathway for magma to ascend to the crust and control not only the position of the vents, but also the shape of the volcanoes forming on top of the vents. These lines match the strike of the Magallanes-Fagnano fault zone and the older Patagonian Austral Rift. Faults within the field have been active in the Tertiary and into the Holocene, and a graben in the southwestern part of the field has diverted lava flows.

The volcanic field is in the drainage basin of the Gallegos River, which passes north of it. Its tributary Rio Chico crosses the volcanic field from southwest to northeast. The terrain of the field is highly permeable to water, which later forms wetlands that attract a number of birds and springs that are used as a source of water. Maars are not the only water bodies within the field; lakes formed by lava dams, glacial lakes and lakes formed by wind deflation also exist. Some of these water bodies dry up late in summer, allowing wind to remove sediments from their lakebeds, which thus become the origin of long dune fields. Active growth of such windstreaks (Note: Windstreaks are patterns of discoloured ground that are formed when wind redistributes sediments behind topography like craters or depressions.) has been observed in Pali-Aike. Windstreaks are an uncommon occurrence on Earth; they are much more common on Mars.

=== Regional ===
Pali-Aike is part of the Patagonian back-arc, a province of plateau lavas of Cenozoic age. These plateau lavas are of alkaline to tholeiitic composition; hawaiite, trachyandesite and trachyte are present in smaller amounts. From south to north these plateau lavas include Pali-Aike itself, Meseta Vizcachas, Meseta de la Muerte, Gran Meseta Central, Meseta Buenos Aires, Cerro Pedrero, Meseta de Somuncura, Pino Hachado and Buta Ranquil; Pali-Aike is the southernmost and youngest lava plateau in Patagonia. Their activity began 16 million years ago, when the Chile Ridge collided with the Peru–Chile Trench and thus caused a tear in the subducting slab and the formation of a slab window beneath Patagonia. Another theory is that slab rollback might instead be the mechanism by which volcanism is triggered in the Pali-Aike region. The age trends of volcanism have been interpreted as indicating either a southward migration or a northeastward one in the case of the plateau lavas, following the movement of the triple junction to the north; in that case Pali-Aike would be an exception, probably due to local tectonic effects. However, some older plateau lavas in the north formed in response to an earlier ridge subduction event in the Eocene and Palaeocene.

The actual Andean volcanic arc is located 300 kilometres (190 mi) west of Pali-Aike, in the form of the Austral Volcanic Zone, a chain of stratovolcanoes and one volcanic field (Fueguino), which is South America's southernmost volcano. The Camusu Aike volcanic field, dated at 2.5–2.9 million years old, is 200 kilometres (120 mi) northwest and the Morro Chico volcano about 50 kilometres (31 mi) west of Pali-Aike.

== Geology ==
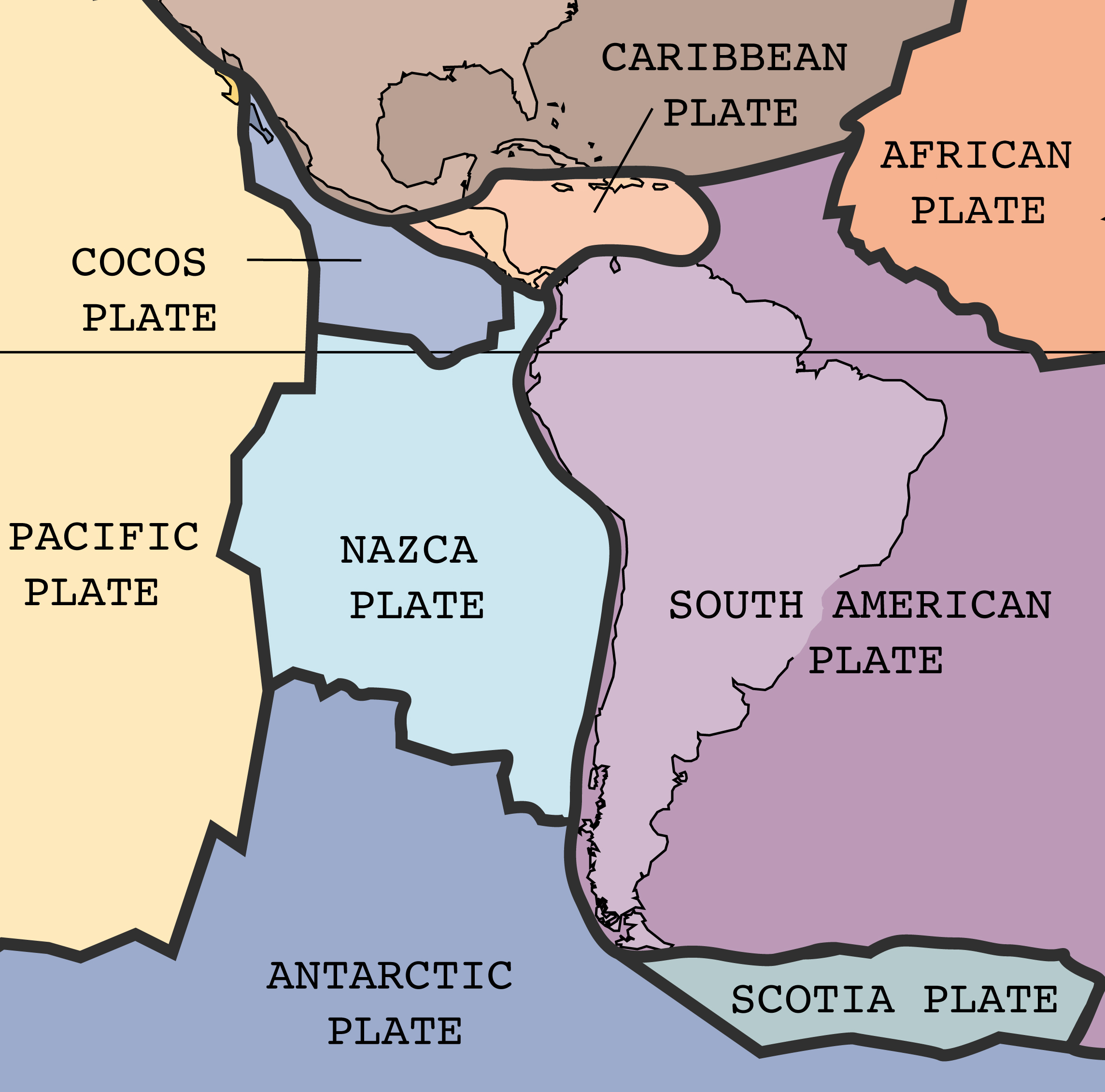
Tectonic plates around South America

At the southern end of South America, the Antarctic Plate subducts beneath South America at a rate of 2 centimetres per year (0.79 in/year) in the Peru–Chile Trench. This subduction process has caused adakitic volcanism on the western margin of southernmost South America, forming the Austral Volcanic Zone.

Patagonia is a region where four tectonic plates, the Antarctic Plate, the Nazca Plate, the Scotia Plate and the South America Plate, interact. Starting 4 million years ago the Chile Ridge collided with the Peru–Chile Trench. This collision originally occurred west of Tierra del Fuego, but has since moved northward towards the Taitao Peninsula. Farther south the interaction between the Scotia and South America plates gave rise to the Deseado and Magallanes-Fagnano faults.

=== Composition ===
The Pali-Aike volcanic field is mainly made up of alkali basalt and basanite, which form a sodium-rich alkaline suite; nephelinite has been reported and hawaiite is rare. The most important phenocrystic phase is olivine, which also appears as xenocrysts; other minerals include clinopyroxene, diopside and plagioclase. The groundmass has a similar composition with the addition of augite, feldspar and magnetite and occasionally ilmenite and nepheline. Pali-Aike rocks typically feature ultramafic xenoliths containing augite, dunite, eclogite, garnet, harzburgite, lherzolite, peridotite, phlogopite, pyroxenite, spinel and wehrlites. The composition of these xenoliths indicates that they originated from both the crust and the mantle. In addition, rocks from Pali-Aike contain inclusions of fluids consisting of carbon dioxide. Some rocks have been weathered and form palagonite.

Elemental composition is typical for alkaline intraplate basalts. The geochemistry of Pali-Aike rocks has been interpreted as originating from the melting of peridotite in the mantle along with fractionation of olivine and with residual garnet; there is no trace of geochemical influence of the adjacent Andean Volcanic Belt and the associated subduction zone. An older oceanic lithosphere that was emplaced during the Proterozoic-Palaeozoic in the area is also involved in magma genesis. The various isotope ratios are typical for so-called "cratonic" Patagonian back-arc basalts that are remote from the Andean Volcanic Belt and resemble ocean island basalts; a role of the Bouvet hotspot of the Atlantic in generating them has been discussed.

=== Geologic record ===
The basement beneath Pali-Aike contains the Magallanes Basin of Jurassic age, which formed during the breakup of Gondwana and was later filled by volcanic and sedimentary rocks. The mantle underneath Pali-Aike is up to 2.5 billion years old (Archean) and was modified by tectonic events like the opening of the South Atlantic Ocean and more than one instance of metasomatism. The partly Neoproterozoic Deseado Massif lies north of Pali-Aike and may extend beneath the field to Tierra del Fuego; there is no evidence that a Precambrian basement exists in the Pali-Aike area. During the Oligocene a marine transgression deposited the Patagonia Formation, and during the Miocene fluvial sediments formed the Santa Cruz Formation. Sedimentation ceased in the region 14 million years ago, probably because by that time the rain shadow of the Andes was effective in the area. At that time, the Chile Ridge first collided with the Peru–Chile Trench west of Tierra del Fuego; since then the collision zone has migrated north to the Taitao Peninsula off western Chile.

Moraines occur west and south from the volcanic field. The Pali-Aike area was glaciated during the middle Pleistocene, and glaciers eroded contemporary lava flows. In part on the basis of the dates of these lava flows, it was established that the older and larger glaciation (Bella Vista Glaciation) occurred between 1.17 and 1.02 million years ago. The last glaciation (Cabo Vírgenes, Río Ciaike and Telken VI-I) was less extensive but reached the Atlantic Ocean at times. This glaciation ended before 760,000 years ago; there is no evidence of Last Glacial Maximum/Llanquihue glaciation glaciers in the area.

=== Cause of volcanism ===
The origin of oceanic-type magmas close to plate boundaries, which occur in other places of the world as well, is usually attributed to slab-dependent processes. The most important among these is the formation of slab windows (gaps in the downgoing plate which allow asthenosphere to ascend) when spreading ridges collide with subduction zones. The slab window generated by the Chile Ridge's subduction passed at the latitudes of Pali-Aike about 4.5 million years ago; volcanic activity commenced soon afterwards but the time difference was enough for any subduction-influenced mantle to be displaced by fresher mantle moving through the window, which is the main source of the Pali-Aike volcanic rocks. Eight to six million years ago, a change in the motion of the South America Plate relative to the Scotia Plate caused the onset of a stretching tectonic regime in the Pali-Aike area, thus allowing the ascent of magmas. The large amounts of xenoliths and primitiveness (Note: A primitive magma is one that has not undergone any evolution as would occur in, e.g., a magma chamber.) of the magmas suggest that once they had formed, they very quickly rose through the crust to the surface.

== Eruptive history ==
Volcanic activity at Pali-Aike spans the late Pliocene to Holocene and has been subdivided into the three units U1, U2 and U3. The oldest U1 unit consists of basaltic plateaus, while U2 and U3 are individual vents with accompanying lava flows. An additional Miocene volcanic stage ("Basaltos Bella Vista") crops out at the northwestern end of the volcanic field and is heavily eroded. There is no evidence of a systematic migration of vent sites. Potassium–argon dating has yielded ages of between 3.78 and 0.17 million years ago. Several eruptions 770,000 years ago formed maars, including Laguna Timone. The age of Potrok Aike is not known with certainty but its minimum age on the basis of sediment core data is 240,000 years before present.

The youngest vent is Diablo Negro-La Morada del Diablo along the Chile-Argentina border, which covered an area of 100 square kilometres (39 sq mi) with lava. Volcanic deposits have covered archaeological artifacts at the Pali-Aike Cave, indicating volcanic activity between 10,000 and 5,000 years before present and within the last 15,000 years; the Global Volcanism Program mentions a 5,550 ± 2,500 BCE eruption. Sediment cores from Laguna Azul give an approximate age of 3,400 or 11790+390
−720 years before present, suggesting that this vent formed during the Holocene. Tephra deposits in the region may have originated at Pali-Aike. The volcanic field was rated Argentina's 18th (out of 38) most dangerous volcano in a 2016 study.

== Climate, vegetation and fauna ==
The climate in the region is windy and cold, with mild winters owing to the oceanic influence, and dry, bordering on semi-desert with precipitation ranging between 300–150 millimetres per year (11.8–5.9 in/year). These patterns are owing to the closeness of Antarctica, the cold Humboldt current and Falklands current ocean currents and the rain shadow of the Andes. Some maars and craters in Pali-Aike have been used for palaeoclimatological research, in the form of sediment core analysis, such as Laguna Azul, Potrok Aike and Magallanes Maar.

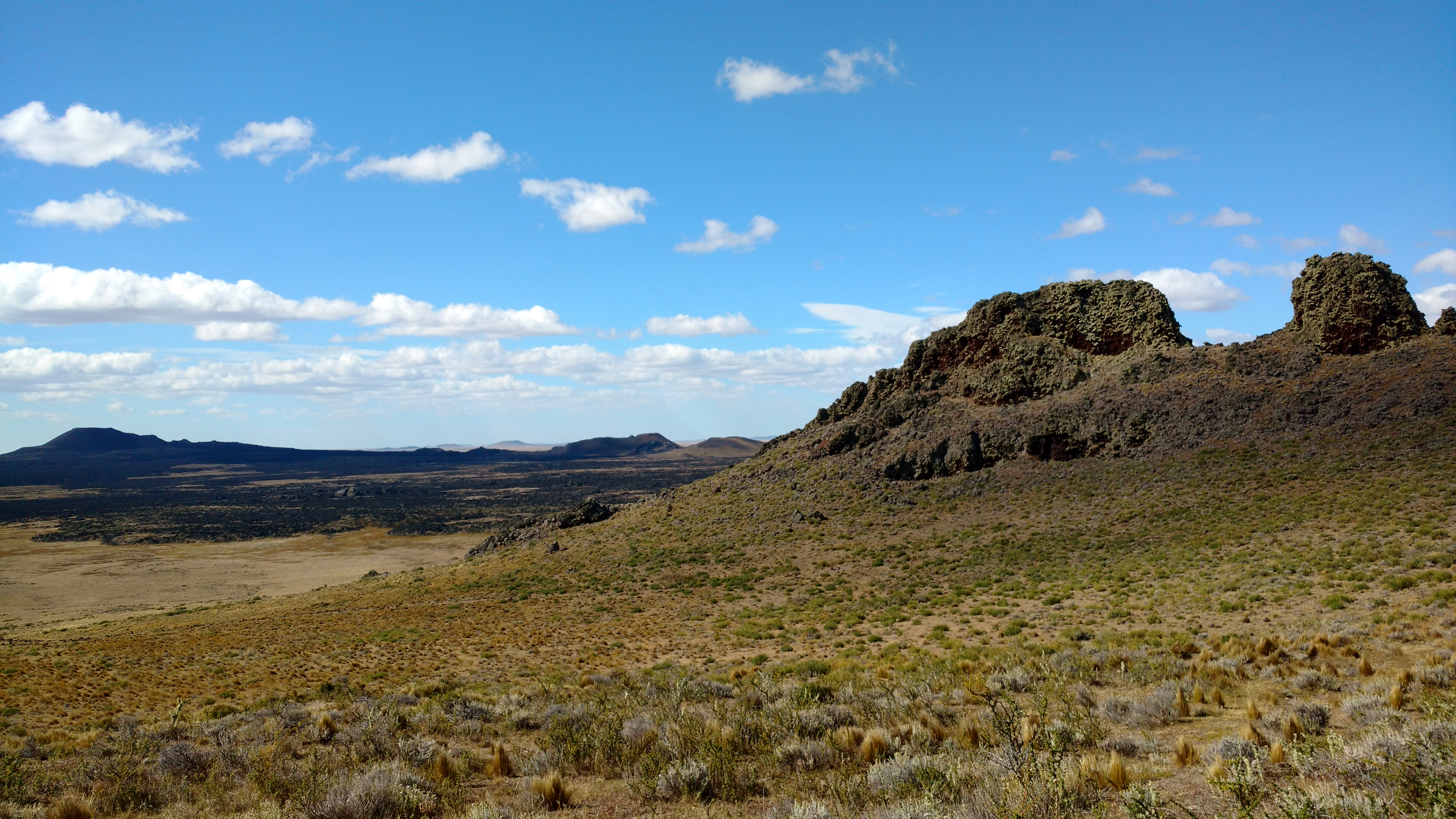
Landscape of Pali-Aike

The regional vegetation is grassland and shrubs, with lichens growing on rocks. The dominant grass species is Festuca gracillima, although Festuca pallescens has been described as the dominant species in the wetter west. Festuca is accompanied by bushes of Chiliotrichum diffusum and red crowberry in the wetter regions and by bushes of Nardophyllum bryoides and Nassauvia ulicina in the drier regions. Various herbs and dicots complete the regional flora. The highly permeable basalts intercept precipitation, forming active aquifers that feed into wetlands. Animal species present in the Chilean national park include armadillos, gray foxes, guanacos, Humboldt's hog-nosed skunks, pumas and red foxes. Bird species include Chloephaga and Theristicus species, black-chested buzzard-eagles, cinereous harriers, crested caracaras, harriers, kestrels, peregrine falcons, rheas and southern lapwings, but also aquatic birds like Calidris species, Coscoroba swans, flamingos, two-banded plovers, yellow-billed pintails and yellow-billed teals.

Palaeorecords indicate that ecological conditions varied from place to place in the wider region and during the last 50,000 years. Before about 11,000 years ago, the region was covered by a treeless steppe. Caves have yielded fossils of animals that lived there during the Holocene and Pleistocene, as well as now-extinct animals, although the former fauna in the region is poorly studied. Fossil animals include big cats and ground sloths. Since the arrival of Europeans in the late 19th century, invasive European weeds and sheep farming have altered the regional ecosystem.

== Archaeology and human history ==
Early humans inhabited the Pali-Aike region since about 10,000 years ago, including various caves such as Fell Cave, Pali-Aike cave, Condor 1, Cueva del Puma, Cueva de los Chingues, Cueva La Carlota I, Don Ariel, Las Buitreras, Orejas de Burro but also non-cave sites such as Laguna Thomas Gould. Human use of Fell Cave goes back at least 8,000 years and their presence at Pali-Aike is among the oldest human activities in Patagonia. Archaeological research in the volcanic field began in the 1930s.

Prehistoric human activity was concentrated in the southern, wetter sector of the volcanic field. The lakes, rivers, seasonal waterbodies and the volcanic landscape with caves have a reliable supply of water and offered refuge to these people, drawing them to the volcanic field; in turn they might have settled the rest of the wider region starting from Pali-Aike. They left archaeological sites, petroglyphs, rock carvings (Note: The rock art in the Pali-Aike volcanic field has been subject to dedicated investigations, including of their ages and styles. At least 71 sites with rock art were known as of 2023.) and stone tools behind; even some ancient burials have been found. The volcanic field was a source of volcanic rocks such as obsidian for the manufacturing of archaeological artifacts but, perhaps because of the low quality of the rocks, they had only limited use; instead people used obsidian from more remote sources. Weathered volcanic rocks from the Pali-Aike volcanic field were used as red pigments in rock art.

Today sheep are farmed in the volcanic field. On the Chilean side, the Pali-Aike volcanic field is part of the Pali-Aike National Park and a few volcanic centres have been investigated as possible geosites. Laguna Azul is already a provincial geosite and tourism target. The Pali-Aike National Park was created in 1970 on the Chilean side and the Laguna Azul Provincial Reserve on the Argentine side, which encompasses Laguna Azul, in 2005.

== See also ==
- Carrán-Los Venados, another volcanic field with very large maars in Chile
- List of volcanic fields
