= Penitente River =

River in Argentina and Chile

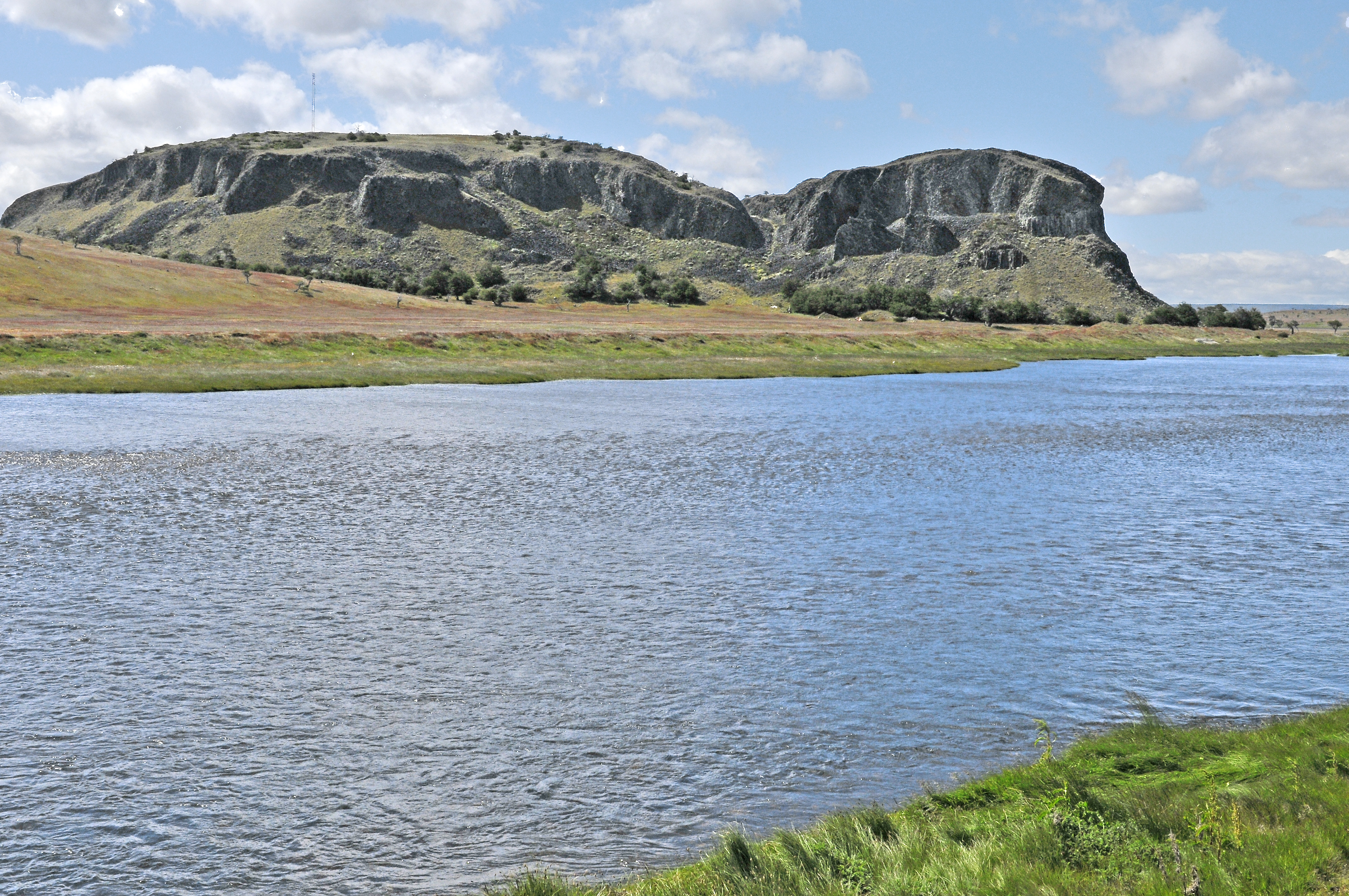

- Location within Southern Patagonia

Location
- Countries: Argentina; Chile

Physical characteristics
- Source
  - location: Chile
- Mouth
  - location: Gallegos River, Argentina
  - coordinates: 51°53′46.07″S 71°35′38.11″W

The Penitente River (Spanish: río Penitente) is a river located in southern Patagonia. The river originates in Chile in the south and flows north into Argentina. Somewhere in Argentina the river becomes the origin of the Gallegos River, but sources disagree whether this happens at the confluence of it with the Rubens River or with the Turbio River.
