= Windstreak =

Planetary surface feature of aeolian origin

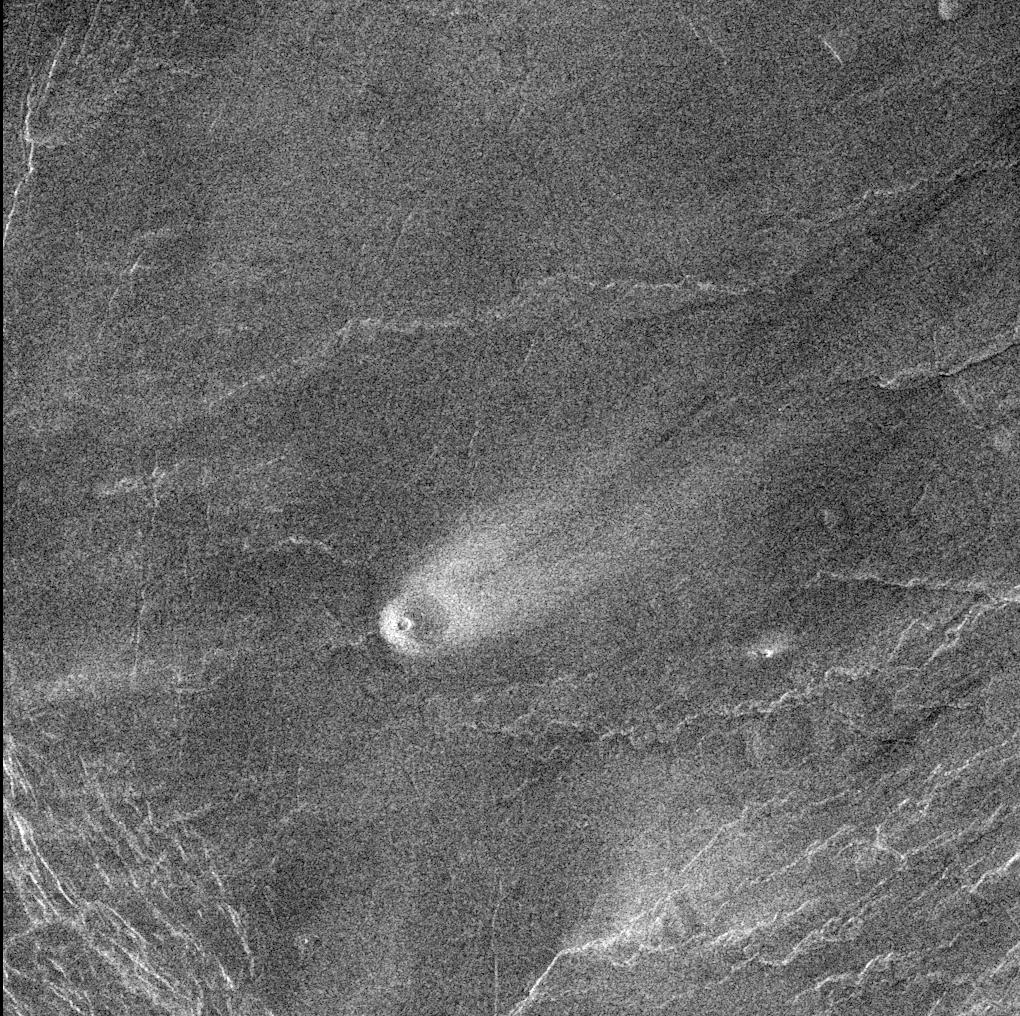
An example of a windstreak, at a volcano on Mars

A windstreak is a planetary surface feature of aeolian origin characterized by an albedo that contrasts with surrounding surface in an elongated pattern. Windstreaks are associated with topographical obstacles, and are very commonly, but not exclusively, found near craters. These features have been observed on Mars, Venus, Titan, and the Earth, although they are considered rare on Earth. Terrestrial examples of windstreaks are found at the Pali-Aike volcanic field.

Windstreaks are a term that is more used in remote sensing, as such an albedo pattern can be representative of many geomorphological features, albeit all of an aeolian origin. All forms of sediment transport (saltation, traction, and suspension) and sediment sizes (clay to gravel) are considered to be involved during windstreak formation, but the net result is that some variation occurs between the streak's surface and the surrounding surface. Thomas et al. (1981) suggested three broad types of windstreak, which is still cited in later literature. These types include (1) bright streaks (high albedo streak with low albedo surface), where dust is deposited from suspension; (2) dark streaks (low albedo streak with high albedo surface) characterized by the erosion of bright material; and (3) dark streaks where dark material is emplaced from saltation.
