= Rubens River =

- Location within Southern Patagonia

Location
- Countries: Argentina; Chile

Physical characteristics
- Source
  - location: Cordillera Aníbal Pinto, Chile
- Mouth
  - location: Gallegos River or Penitente River, Argentina
  - coordinates: 51°53′46.24″S 71°35′40.49″W

The Rubens River (Spanish: río Rubens) is a river located in southern Patagonia. The river originates in Chile's Cordillera Aníbal Pinto in the southwest and flows northeast into Argentina where it joins the Penitente River. Sources disagree whether Rubens River is a tributary of the Penitentes river or whether Gallegos River originates at their confluence.
