= Rye Meeting House =

Historic church in New York, United States

- U.S. National Register of Historic Places
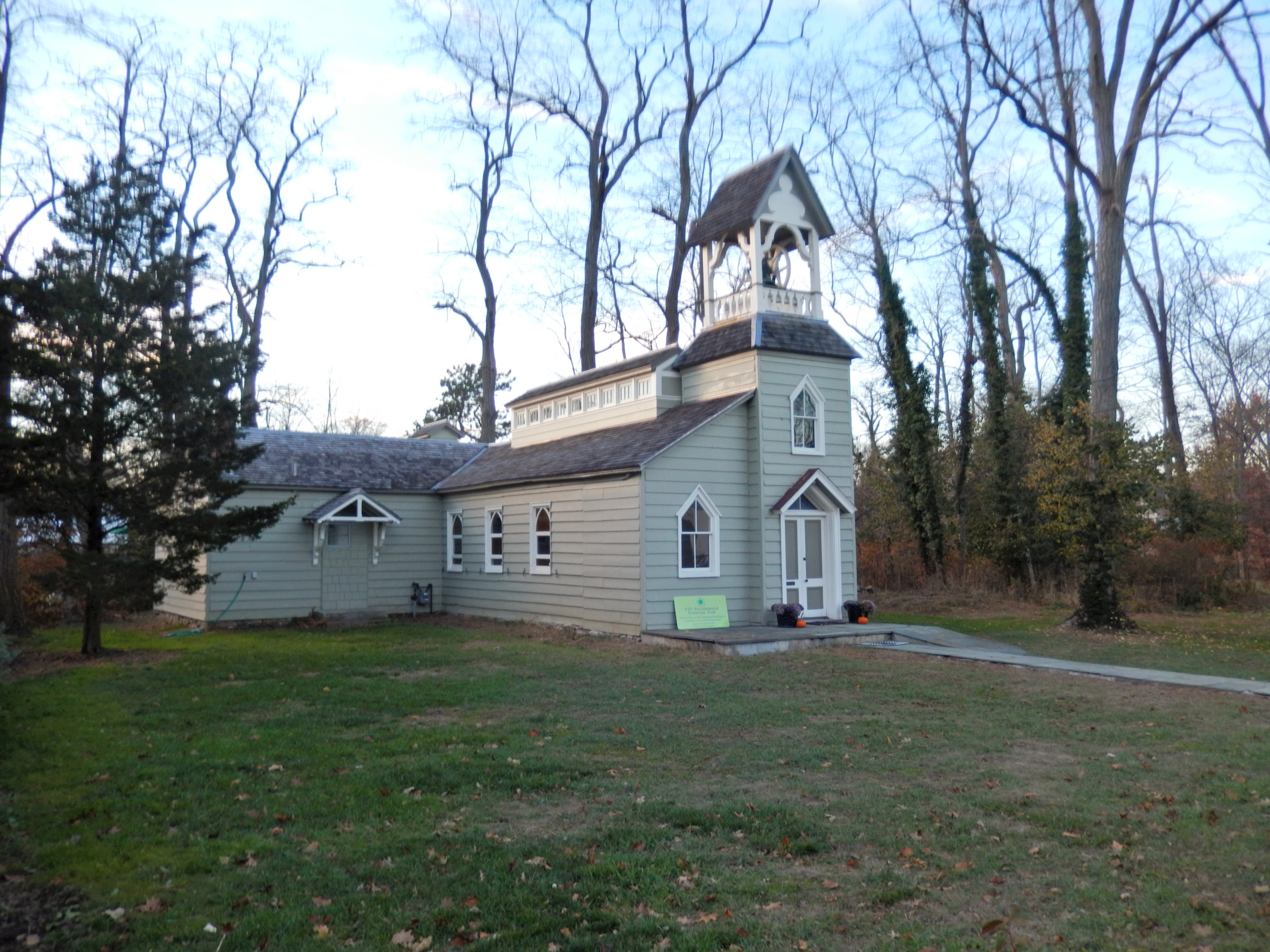
- Rye Meeting House, built in the 1830s, south wing 1875, bell tower 1877

- Location within New York Location within the United States
- Location: 624 Milton Rd., Rye, New York
- Coordinates: 40°57′12″N 73°41′20″W
- Area: 1.16 acres (0.47 ha)
- Built: c. 1850, 1867, 1871, 1875, 1877
- Architectural style: Stick Style
- NRHP reference No.: 10001134
- Added to NRHP: January 14, 2011

Rye Meeting House, also known as Milton Mission Chapel, Grace Chapel, and the Friends Meeting House, is a historic Quaker meeting house located at Rye, Westchester County, New York. The property is adjacent to the Bird Homestead. It is a one-story, wood-frame building on a stone foundation with two main volumes, a nave and an asymmetrical transept. The exterior is sheathed in clapboard and shingles and exhibits characteristics of the Stick style. The front facade features a 2 1/2-story bell tower. The building was built in the 1830s as a school house. It was moved to its present site in 1867, and enlarged in 1871, 1875, and 1877. At the time, the church was a mission church of nearby Christ's Church, an Episcopal church. The Quakers obtained the property in 1959. The property was deeded to the city of Rye in 2002.

It was added to the National Register of Historic Places in 2011. In 2015, The Preservation League of New York State selected the historic restoration work completed on Rye Meeting House to receive an Excellence in Historic Preservation award.

== See also ==
- National Register of Historic Places listings in southern Westchester County, New York
