= Junius Bird =

American archaeologist

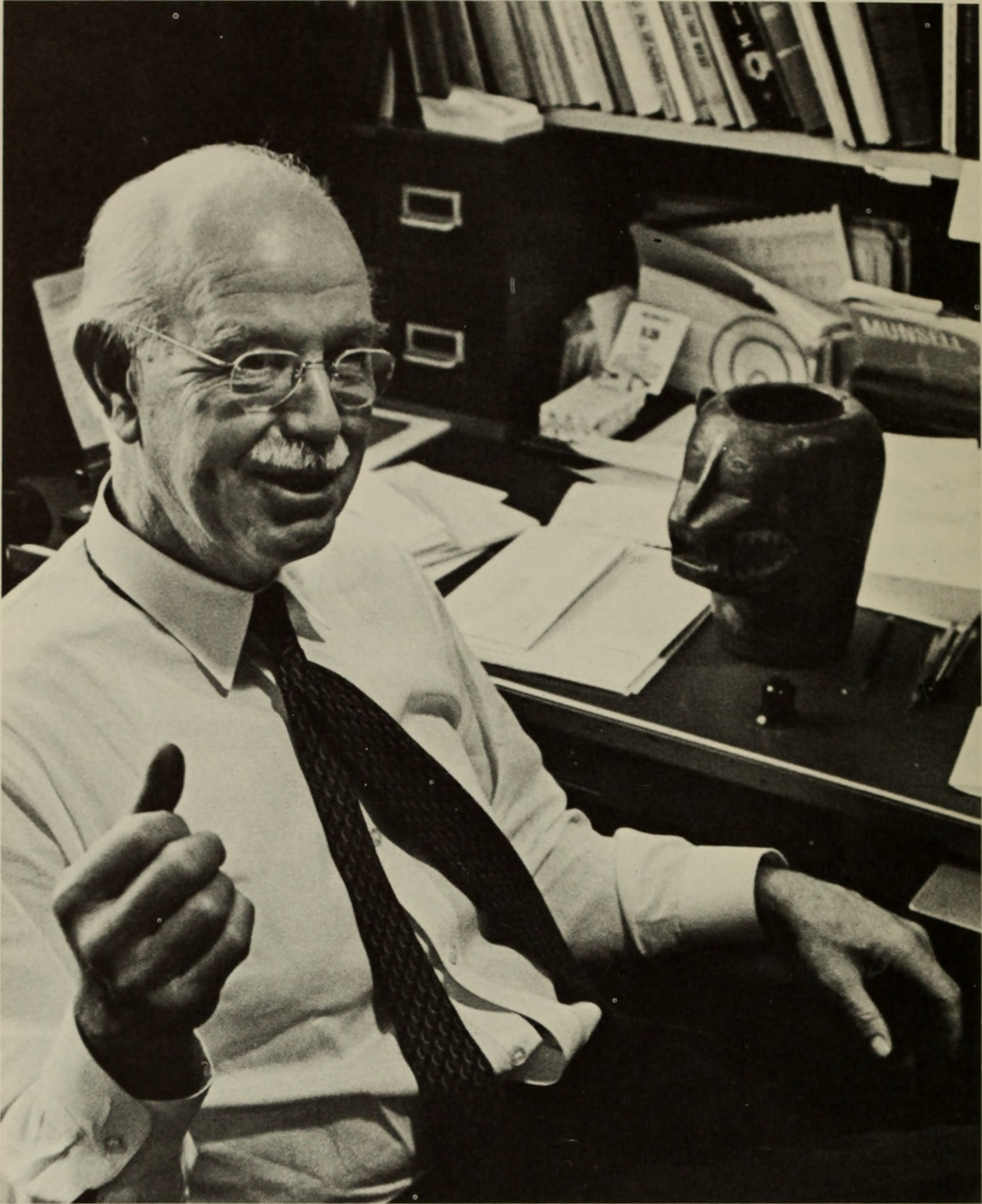
Bird in the 1960s

Junius Bouton Bird (1907–1982), born in Rye, New York, was an American archaeologist who was appointed curator of South American Archaeology at the American Museum of Natural History in 1934. His contributions to the study of ecology, climate, and pre-Columbian archaeology earned him several awards including: The Viking Fund Medal for Archaeology (1956) and The Order of "El sol de Peru" (1974). With his excavations e.g. at Fell Cave in the late 1930s Bird was one of the pioneers of Patagonian archaeology and contributed to the investigation of the earliest settlement of the Americas. His wife, Margaret McKelvy Bird, accompanied him on a number of expeditions and was a close co-worker throughout their life together.

In 1961 he was elected as the president of the Society for American Archaeology. He studied at Columbia College and was in the class of 1930.

Bird has been cited as a possible real-life inspiration for the fictional movie character Indiana Jones.

He died April 2, 1982 at the age of 74.

== See also ==
- List of fossil sites (with link directory)
- List of hominina (hominid) fossils (with images)
