= Pali-Aike National Park =

National park in Chile

- IUCN category II (national park)
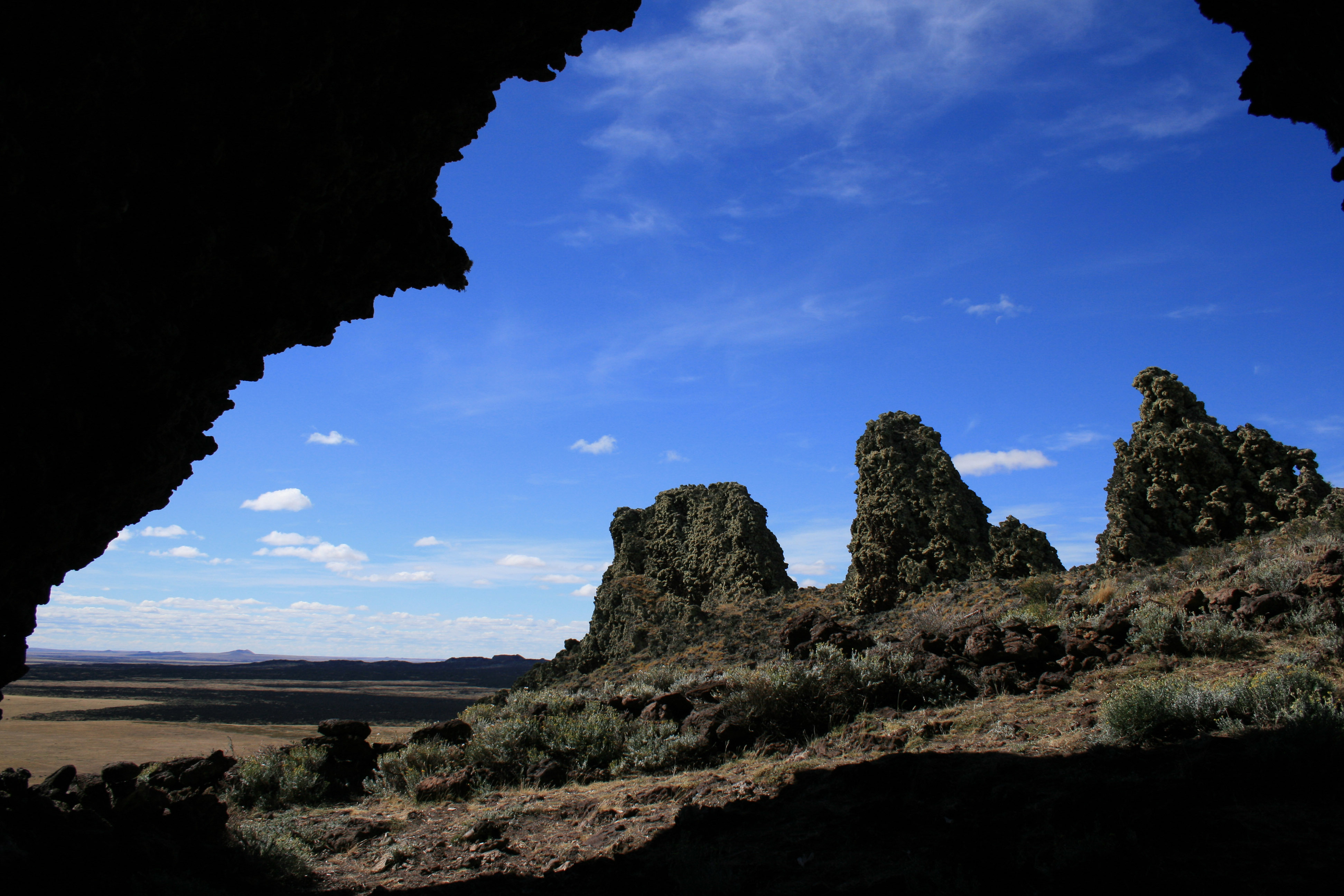
- Interactive map of Pali-Aike National Park
- Location: Magallanes Region, Chile
- Nearest city: Punta Arenas
- Coordinates: 52°06′S 69°44′W
- Area: 5,030 ha (12,429 acres)
- Established: October 23, 1970
- Visitors: 2,537 (in 2016)
- Governing body: Corporación Nacional Forestal

The Pali-Aike National Park is a park located in the Magallanes Region of Patagonia in Chile. Pali-Aike is a Tehuelche name that means Desolate Place. Created in 1970, it covers an area of 5,030 hectares (12,429 acres) and includes part of the Pali-Aike Volcanic Field. The park draws its name from a prominent volcanic cone known as the Pali Aike Crater.

It includes native flora and fauna, with some species being exclusive to the region, not being found anywhere else in the world. The park has many rocky formations covered in 1000-year-old lava.

== Archaeology ==
Human crania from early prehistoric occupation have been recovered from a cave at the Pali Aike Crater.

This archaeological site goes back to the Paleo-Indian period. The stone tools from the cave are dated to around 11,000 years BP, and are among the oldest in South America.

Pali Aike cave has strong similarities to Fell's cave, located in the vicinity outside the reserve.

Three cremated human skeletons have been discovered here. The site was discovered and studied in the 1930s by Junius Bird. It represents a temporary encampment of early hunters. Pleistocene fauna remains have also been discovered.

These early peoples used the type of darts known as 'fluted fishtail points'.

Different kinds of other tools have also been found at the cave, among them cylindrical stones which seem to have had a ceremonial use. The stratigraphy of these sites goes back 8,600 to 11,000 years ago.

Petroglyphs and rock carvings have also been found in the area. Weathered volcanic rocks from the Pali-Aike volcanic field were used as red pigments.

These peoples hunted the mylodon (Mylodon listai), the American horse (Parahipparion saldasi), guanaco, fox, puma, birds, rodents, and also gathered ostrich eggs.

They used little or no marine products, despite being relatively close to the sea.

In 1998, the Pali Aike and Fell's Caves were jointly proposed to UNESCO as World Heritage Sites.

== Gallery ==
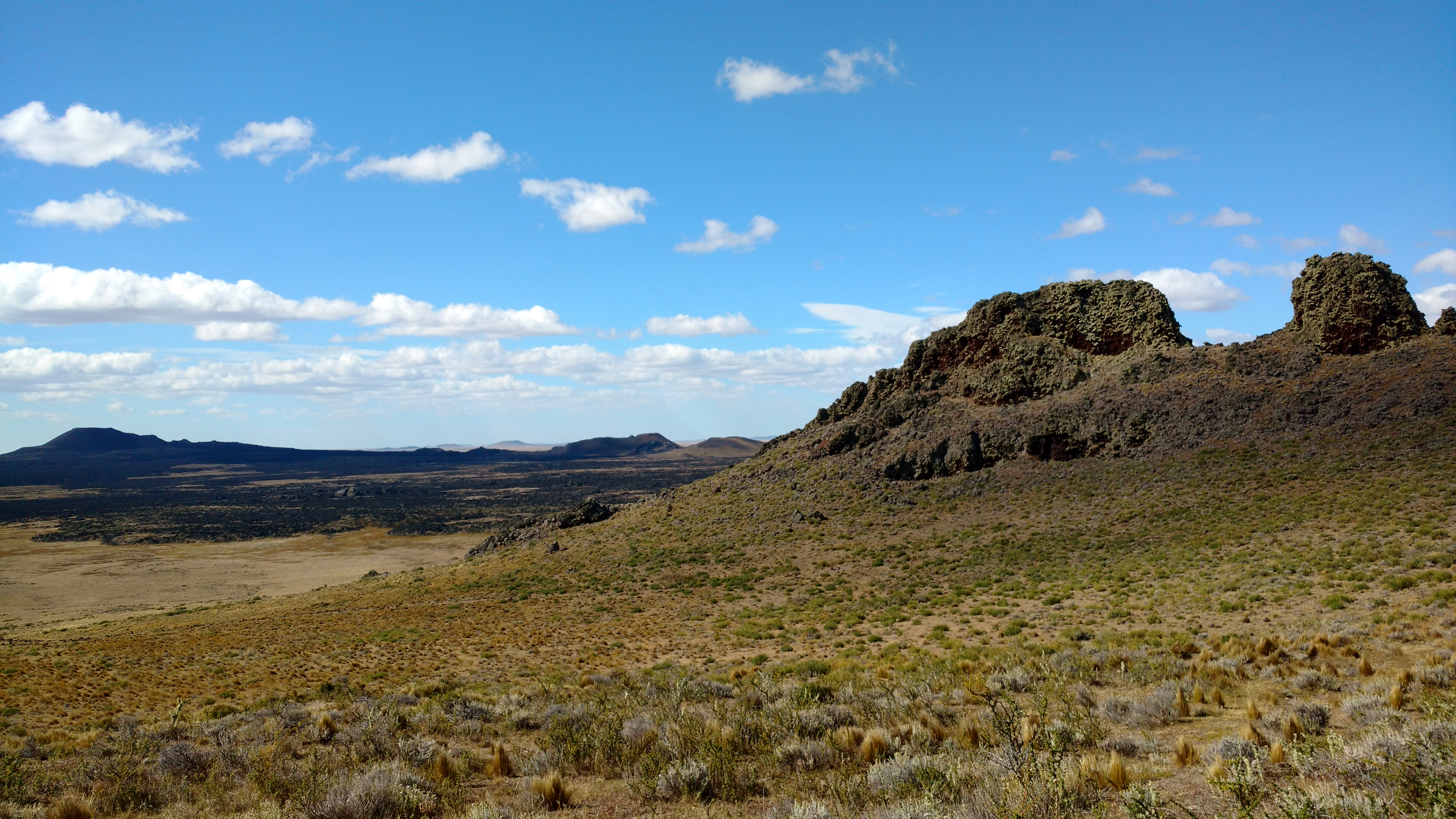

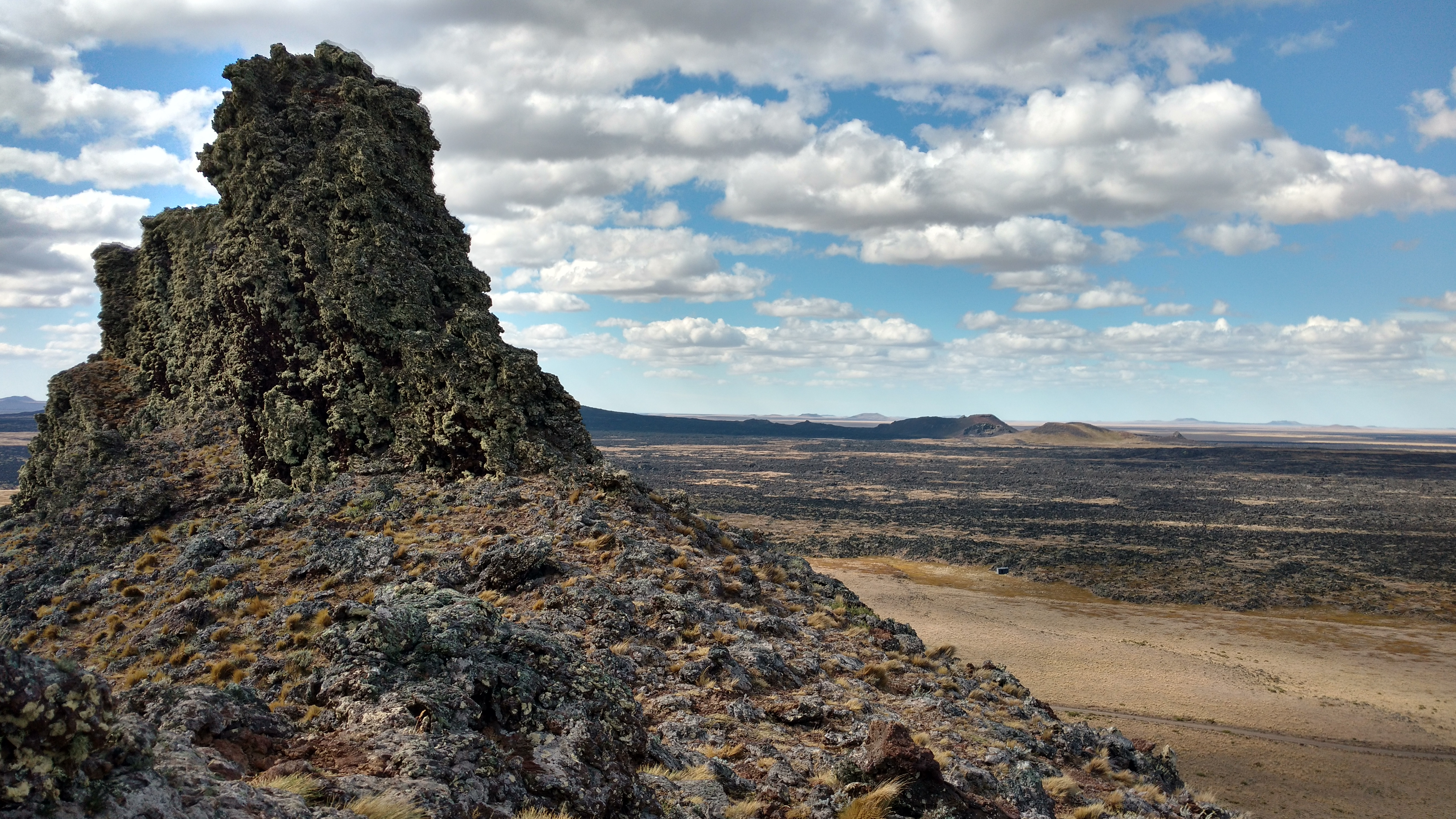

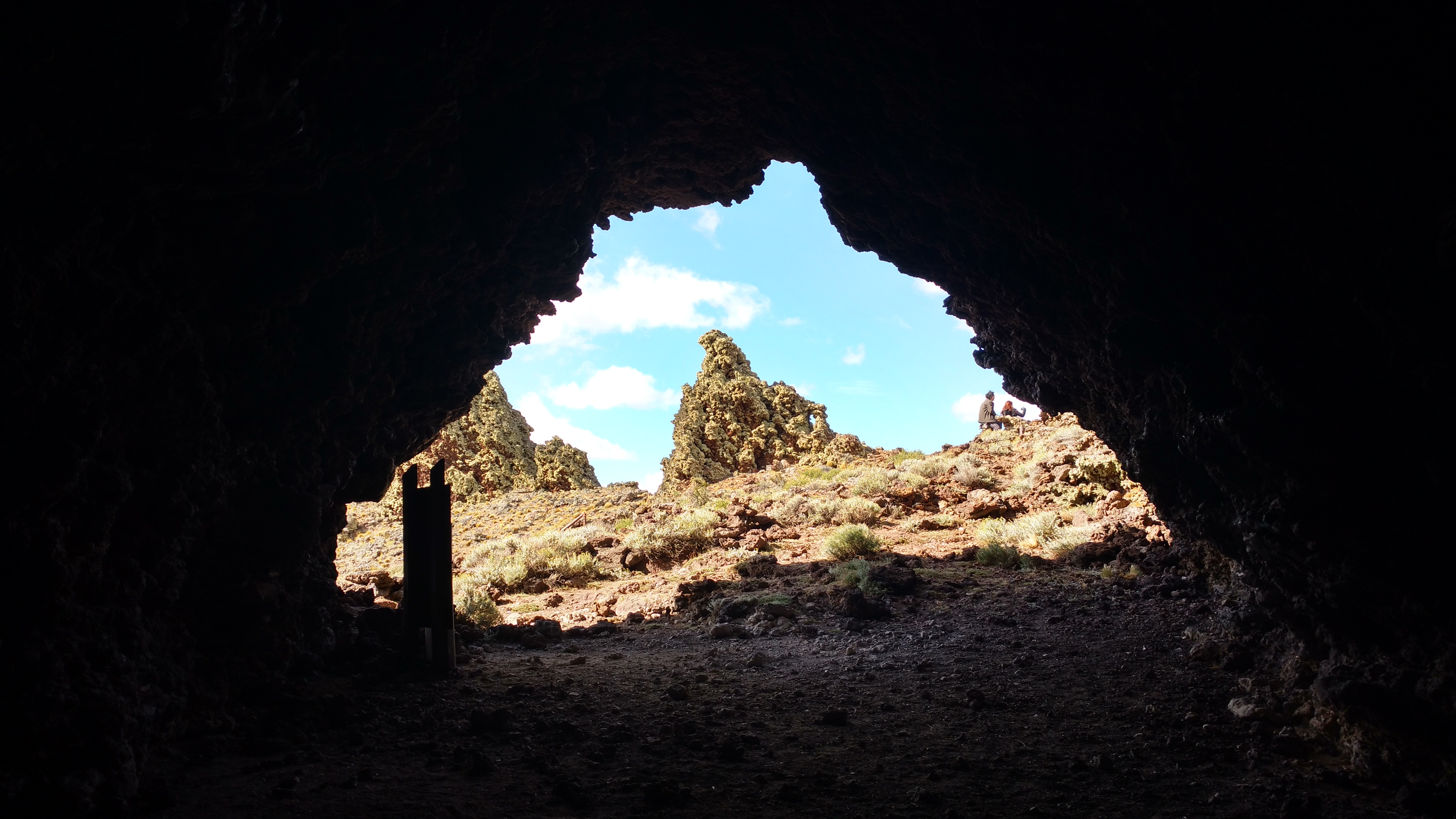
Pali Aike Cave

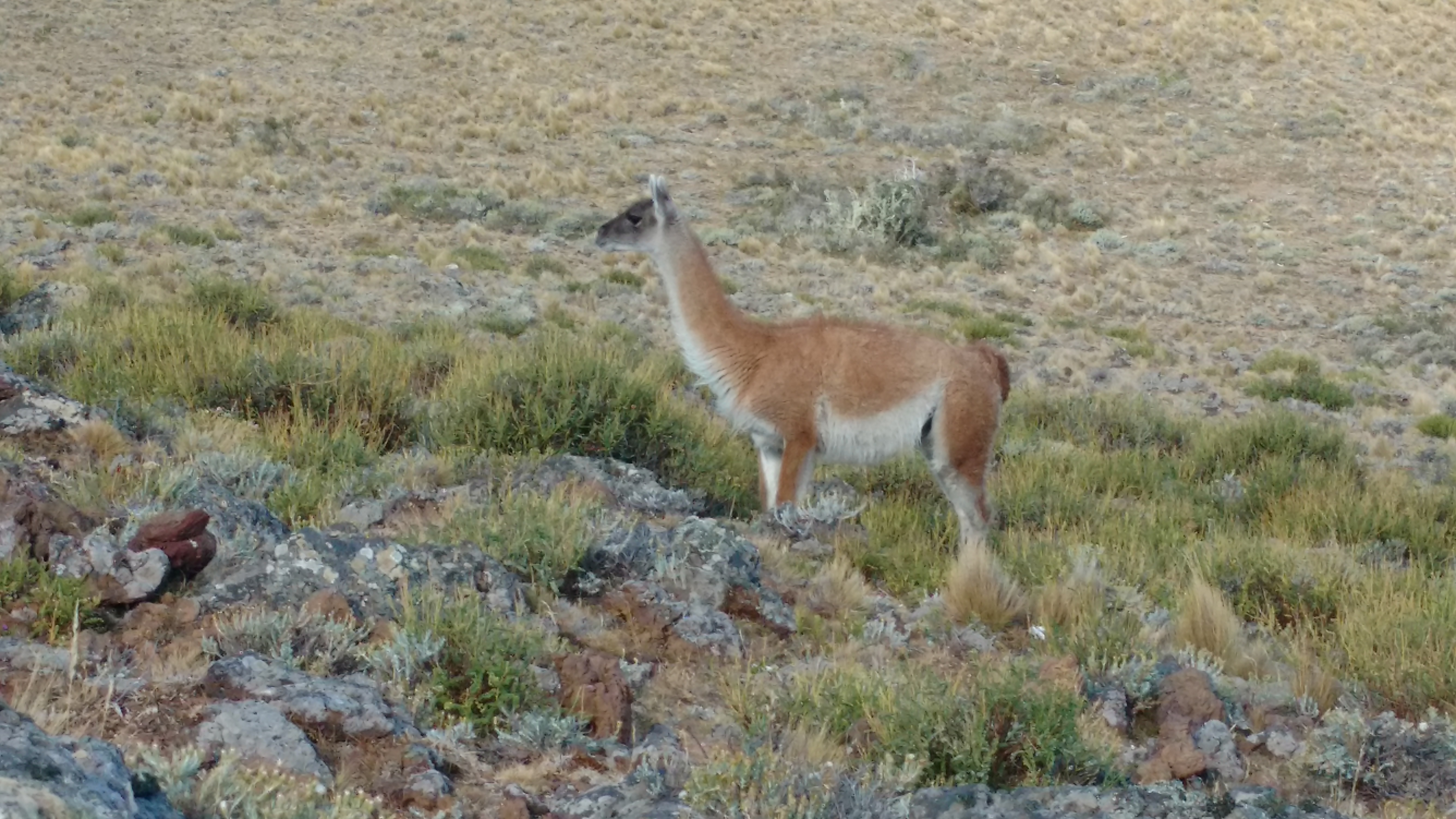
Guanaco inside the park

== See also ==
- Cueva Fell
- Lago Ana
