= Gallegos River =

River in Argentina

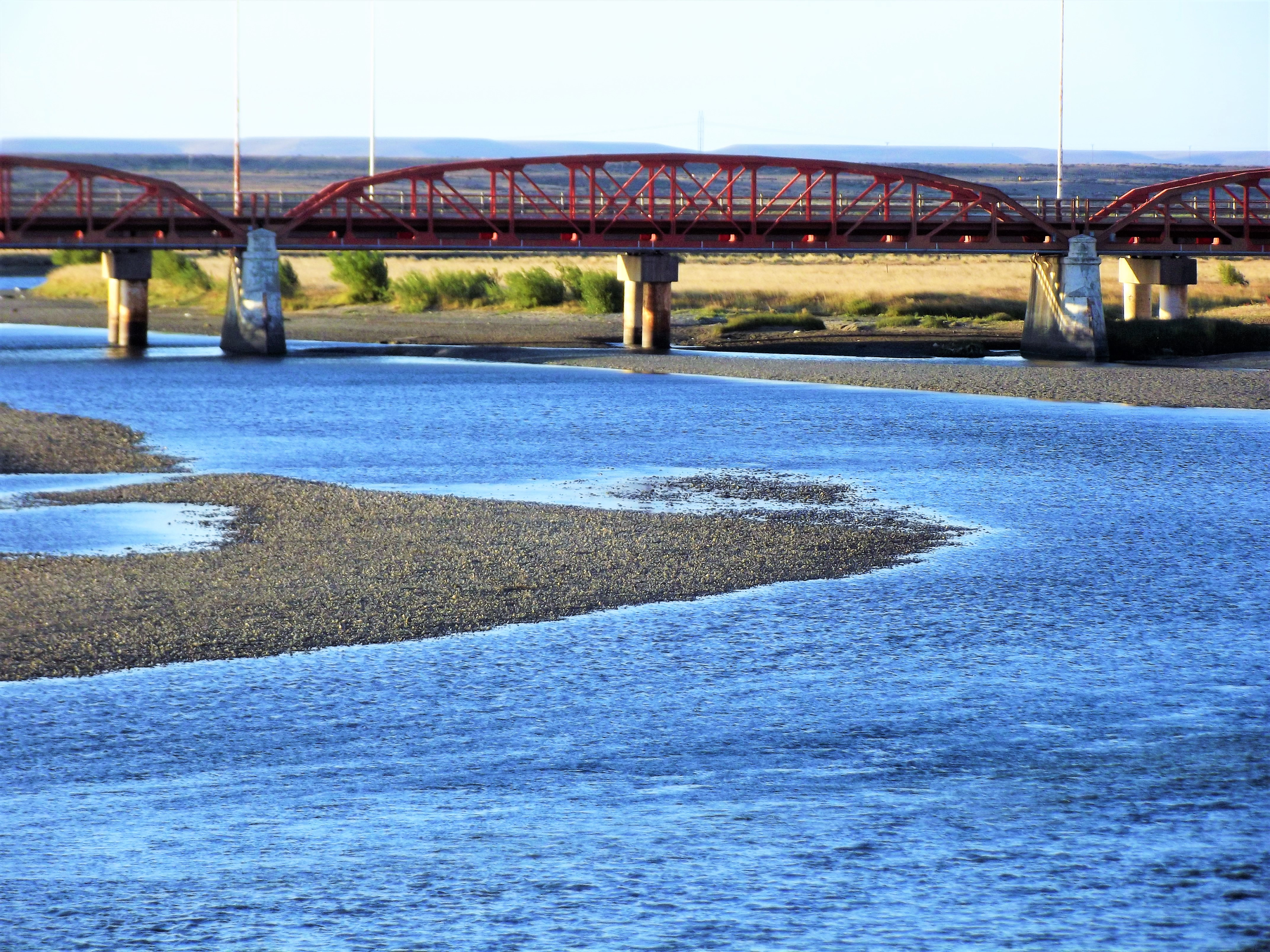
- Gallegos River

- Location of the mouth

Location
- Country: Argentina

Physical characteristics
- Source: Confluence of Rubens River with Penitente River or confluence of Penitente River with Turbio River
- Mouth
  - location: Atlantic Ocean
  - coordinates: 51°35′40″S 68°58′30″W
- Length: 180 km (110 mi)
- Basin size: 10,120 km^{2} (3,910 sq mi)

The Gallegos River (Spanish: Río Gallegos) is a river in the Argentine province of Santa Cruz, on whose estuary lies Río Gallegos city, capital of the province. Given that its basin reaches only the fringes of the Andes mountains it classifies as a sub-Andean river.

There is contradicting information on where river is actually formed. According to one source it forms at the confluence of the rivers Rubens and Penitente. Yet according to another source Rubens River is just a tributary of Penitente River and Gallegos River originates further downstream at the confluence of the rivers Penitentes and Turbio. After traveling 180 kilometres (112 mi) Gallegos River reaches the Atlantic Coast.

On its way east, after crossing a 200-kilometre (120 mi) wide glaciated canyon, it meets the tributaries Turbio, Cóndor, and Zurdo. In spite of this, the river's stream can be drastically reduced during the dry season.

The river, named after Blasco Gallegos, one of the pilots of Ferdinand Magellan's expedition of 1520, is popular for fly fishing for brown trout, principally by tourists.

Part of the drainage basin of the river lies in Chile's Magallanes Region.
