= List of Ancestral Puebloan dwellings in Colorado =

Coordinates: 38.9972°N 105.5478°W

This is a list of Ancestral Puebloan dwellings in the U.S. State of Colorado.

The location of the State of Colorado in the United States of America.

== Pueblo periods ==
Archaeologists have agreed on three main periods of occupation by the Ancestral Puebloans in southwestern Colorado: Pueblo I, Pueblo II, and Pueblo III.

- Pueblo I (750 to 900). Pueblo buildings were constructed with stone, generally oriented to the south, and featured U, E, and L shapes. The buildings were located more closely together than the previous Basketmaker culture and reflected deepening religious celebration. Towers were built, often near kivas, though their purpose (defense?, storage?, ceremonies?) still is debated. Pottery became more versatile, not just for cooking, but now included pitchers, ladles, bowls, jars and dishware for food and drink. White pottery with black designs emerged, the pigments coming from plants. Water management and conservation techniques, including the use of reservoirs and silt-retaining dams, also emerged during this period. Midway through this period, about 900, the number of residential sites in the Hovenweep area increased.
- Pueblo II (900-1150). During the Pueblo II period, a significant increase in population led to the creation of more than 10,000 sites within a span of 250 years. Because much of the land is arid and crop yields were highly variable, people supplemented their diets by hunting, foraging, and trading for food. By the end of the period, there were multiple-story dwellings made primarily of stone masonry, towers (especially in southwestern Colorado and southeastern Utah), and family and community kivas.
- Pueblo III (1150-1300). Rohn and Ferguson, authors of Puebloan Ruins of the Southwest, state that during the Pueblo III period there was a significant community change. Population tended to coalesce into larger community centers at canyon heads or under cliff overhangs. Population peaked between 1200 and 1250 to more than 20,000 in the Mesa Verde region. However, by 1300 most Pueblo people had abandoned the Four Corners area, as the result of climate changes and food shortages. They are believed to have moved south and east to villages in Arizona and New Mexico, especially the Rio Grande valley near what is today Santa Fe and Albuquerque.

== Types of Buildings ==
In addition to the movable structures used by other Native Americans across North and South America, the Pueblo peoples created distinctive structures for living, worshiping, defense, storage, and daily life.

- Pueblo - Referring to both a certain style of Puebloan architecture and groups of people themselves, the term pueblo is used in architectural terms to describe single-story or multistory buildings made of coursed stone or adobe, and occasionally jacal. Usually these buildings were plastered with adobe both inside and outside.
- Kiva - Circular underground buildings used for ceremonies, preparations for ceremonies and as retreats for families during the worst months of winter. Kivas may have evolved from pit houses. Found throughout the Ancestral Pueblo area and in parts of the Mogollon region (central Arizona), they generally feature a bench around the inside walls, pilasters against the walls to hold up the beams of the roof, a fire pit, a ventilator shaft to bring air to the fire pit and a square opening in the roof with a ladder to enter the kiva. A kiva generally was located in front of a family's suite of pueblo rooms.
- Great houses - Large adobe-plastered stone buildings believed to be mostly ceremonial in use, though they may have been used in part as residences. In the Chacoan period (roughly equivalent to PII, 900 to 1150 A.D.) these buildings share certain features, such as large rooms (15 feet square), massive size, elevated position and core-and-veneer masonry. They also often have blocked-in kivas, tower kivas and nearby great kivas. In the Pueblo III (PIII) period (1150-1300 A.D.) ceremonial buildings were less distinct from residential structures in room size and often included enclosed plazas.
- Great kivas - Large versions of traditional "family" kivas that appear to have been intended for use by the larger community, especially in Chacoan times. There are great kivas as large as 75 feet across, such as Casa Rinconada in Chaco Canyon. Roofs are held up by massive posts set into special recesses in the floors. In earlier times, such as PI, great kivas might not be roofed. In the Mogollon region, square great kivas often were built.
- Pit houses - In the Basketmaker and early PI periods most of the populations of the Southwest lived in pit houses, carefully dug rectangular or circular depressions in the earth with branch and mud adobe walls supported by log sized corner posts. While pit houses never completely disappeared, after PI most residences were above-ground blocks of pueblo rooms, usually with at least one "family" kiva in front.
- Cliff dwellings - Pueblos constructed under overhangs in the cliff sides of the mesas in the Southwest. Cliff dwellings were a relatively late development in Pueblo communities (mostly after 1150) and are considered to have been built at least partly for defensive reasons.
- Trincheras - The Hohokam and Trincheras culture used these distinctive type sites in the Southwest and northwest Mexico. Trincheras sites are usually located on steep slopes of hills and low mountains, and are characterized by terraces and walls that stairstep up the slope. Remains of the terraces and walls reminded early explorers of "trincheras," the Spanish term for entrenchments or fortifications.
- Jacal is a type of wall in Pueblo buildings made of woven reeds and sticks covered with adobe. Slim close-set poles were tied together and filled out with mud, clay and grasses.

== Locations ==
=== Archuleta County ===
Site name	Pueblo peoples	Period	Nearest town (modern name)	Location	Type	Description	Photo
Chimney Rock (Site ID 5AA.985)	Ancestral Puebloan	Pueblo II	Chimney Rock	Chimney Rock National Monument	Great house	The Ancient Pueblo People site, designated on the National Register of Historic Places in 1970, was a community inhabited between Durango and Pagosa Springs about 1,000 years ago with about 200 rooms. Rooms in the buildings were used for living, work areas and ceremonial purposes. The site is located within the San Juan National Forest Archaeological Area on 4,100 acres of land. Between May 15 and September 30 the Visitor Center is open and guided walking tours are conducted daily.	

=== Dolores County ===
For Canyons of the Ancients sites, also see the Canyons of the Ancients section.

Site name	Pueblo peoples	Period	Nearest town (modern name)	Location	Type	Description	Photo
Ansel Hall (Site ID 5DL.27)	Ancestral Puebloan	Pueblo II, Pueblo III	Cahone	Private owner		The pueblo village was at least a moderate-sized community. There was one occupation at Ansel Hall from 1080–1150, with its peak period about 1125. The community had great kivas and great houses. Crow Canyon Archaeological Center Research found that at least one of the small sites was built late in the 11th century, about 1074. The village may have been abandoned by 1100, based upon the absence of 12th century white and black pottery.	
Brewer Archaeological District (Site ID 5DL.578)	Ancestral Puebloan	Pueblo II, Pueblo III	Dove Creek			Brewer Archaeological District has two large prehistoric settlement sites: Brewer Mesa Pueblo (11th century) and Brewer Canyon Pueblo (13th century). Brewer Canyon Pueblo, part of the Upper Squaw Canyon Center, had 245 site clusters from 1225 to 1290.	
Champagne Springs (Greenlee) Ruins (Sites 5DL2333-5DL2338)	Ancestral Puebloan	Pueblo I, Pueblo II	Squaw Point, s. of Dove Creek			Ruins situated on two low hill tops on the top of Squaw Point Mesa approximately 6 miles south-southwest of Dove Creek, Colorado. Both sites are characterized by a material culture that appears to be representative of the years spanning the late Pueblo I and early Pueblo II periods.	

=== La Plata County ===
Site name	Pueblo peoples	Period	Nearest town (modern name)	Location	Type	Description	Photo
Darkmold Site (Site ID 5LP4991)	Ancestral Puebloan	Basketmaker	Durango			The Late Archaic Basketmaker II Darkmold Site, inhabited from about 220 BC through AD 750, was added to the Colorado Register of Historic Properties in 2000. Archaeological evidence found at the site include slab-lined roasting pits and bell-shaped pits.	
Durango Rock Shelters Archeology Site (Site ID 5LP4134)	Ancestral Puebloan	Basketmaker, Pueblo I	Durango			Durango Rock Shelters Archeology Site, also known as the Fall Creek Rock Shelters Site, is an Ancient Pueblo People (Anasazi) archaeological site, located in La Plata County, Colorado. People from the Late Basketmaker II and Basketmaker III Eras inhabited the site between AD 1 and AD 1000.	
Spring Creek Archeological District (Site ID 5LP1254)	Ancestral Puebloan	Basketmaker, Pueblo periods	Bayfield			Spring Creek Archaeological District, also known as Zabel Canyon Indian Ruins, is located in the San Juan National Forest. The site was inhabited from 300 BC through Pueblo times Ancient Pueblo People. In the protohistoric periods of southwestern Colorado the Ute, Apache and Navajo ranged and lived in the area. It was added to the National Register of Historic Places in 1983.	
Talus Village (Site ID 5LP4223)	Ancestral Puebloan	Basketmaker	Durango			Talus Village, a Basketmaker II site with Basketmaker pit-house dwellings, was excavated in 1940 by Earl Morris, the first archaeologist to conduct professional excavations in LaPlata County. It was added to the Colorado Register of Historic Properties in 1996.	
Ute Mountain Ute Tribe (Site ID 5MT.4342)	Ancestral Puebloan	Pueblo I, Pueblo II, Pueblo III	Red Mesa			Ute Mountain Ute Mancos Canyon Historic District, located on the Ute Mountain Ute Tribe reservation, was added to the National Register of Historic Places in 1972. It was occupied by puebloan people during the broad periods from 500 to 1499 [they left southwestern Colorado by 1300].	

=== Montezuma County ===
==== Anasazi Heritage Center ====
Site name	Pueblo peoples	Period	Nearest town (modern name)	Location	Type	Description	Photo
Escalante (Site ID 5MT2149)	Ancestral Puebloan	Pueblo II, Pueblo III	Dolores	Anasazi Heritage Center	Great house	Ruins. Escalante Pueblo was constructed approximately 1120 to 1130 and made of groupings of stone walled family and communal rooms, including kivas. The architecture is like that of the Chaco Canyon in present-day New Mexico. The pueblo was also occupied about 1150 and again 1200.	
Dominguez	Ancestral Puebloan	Pueblo II, Pueblo III	Dolores	Anasazi Heritage Center	Great house	Ruins. Dominguez Pueblo, an example of independent family homes outside the main pueblo. Discovered at the site were items that shed light on how the people may have lived, including "6,900 turquoise, jet and shell beads; a shell and turquoise frog pendant and mosaics, two fine ceramic vessels, six bone scrapers, a woven mat and many other items."	

==== Canyons of the Ancients ====
Site name	Pueblo peoples	Period	Nearest town (modern name)	Location	Type	Description	Photo
Sand Canyon (Site ID 5MT16853)	Ancestral Puebloan	Pueblo III	Dolores	Canyons of the Ancients National Monument		One of the largest pueblos of the 13th century, Sand Canyon Pueblo, built between 1250 and 1280, contains at least 20 multi-family room blocks with 420 rooms, 90 kivas, and 14 towers. A spring runs through the center of the walled site that held up to 725 people. Construction was exacting, with care taken to shape stone, and some double and triple walls for stability. Families lived in clusters of rooms that included living, storage and work rooms and had their own family kivas. The community shared roofed plazas, great kivas and towers often connected to kivas. By 1280 new construction had stopped and people began migrating out of the pueblo; By 1290 the pueblo was abandoned, as were other Colorado pueblo sites, never to be inhabited again by puebloan people. The Northern San Juan pueblo, significant for its ceremonial use and burial remains, was added to the National Register of Historic Places in 2005.	
Castle Rock Pueblo	Ancestral Puebloan	Pueblo III	Dolores	Canyons of the Ancients National Monument	Great house	There was one occupation at the Castle Rock Pueblo from 1250–1275, with its peak period about 1260. The community had Great Houses. There were at least 16 kivas, 40 surface rooms, nine possible towers, and a D-shaped enclosure.	
Lowry Pueblo (Site ID 5MT1566)	Ancestral Puebloan	Pueblo II	Pleasant View	Canyons of the Ancients National Monument		There was one occupation at Lowry Pueblo from 1080–1150, with its peak period about 1125. The community had Great Houses, Great kivas and roads. The Lowry Pueblo National Historic Landmark consists of 8 kivas, a great (community) kiva and 40 rooms built as high as three stories. The underground great kiva was built about 1103 and had murals painted over about 5 layers of plaster. About 1110 another kiva was built on top of the original kiva. Based upon the size of the kiva it's thought that the Lowry Pueblo may have been a local center for religious gatherings and celebration.	

==== Hawkins Preserve ====
Site name	Pueblo peoples	Period	Nearest town (modern name)	Location	Type	Description	Photo
Hawkins Pueblo	Ancestral Puebloan	Pueblo II	Cortez	Cortez Cultural Center, Hawkins Preserve		Hawkins Pueblo, occupied by several related groups, is the largest ruin within the preserve. It was most populated in the Pueblo II period, from about 1000 to 1150. The site contains several room block ruins and rubble that contains a kiva, mounds, and middens.	

==== Hovenweep National Monument ====
The Hovenweep National Monument (Site ID 5MT.604) is registered on the National and Colorado State Historic Registers.

Site name	Pueblo peoples	Period	Nearest town (modern name)	Location	Type	Description	Photo
Cajon Group	Ancestral Puebloan		Between Cortez, CO and Blanding, UT	Hovenweep National Monument		Cajon Group, constructed like the Holly, Hackberry and Horseshoe configuration, is located at the head of Allen Canyon. It consists of a cluster of room blocks and the remains of a tower, estimated to house 80-100 people, that was constructed on a boulder that sits below the rim of the canyon. Up to seven kiva depressions are located around the spring. Remnants of wall alignments below the rim on the talus represent possible terrace farming.	
Cutthroat Castle Group	Ancestral Puebloan		Between Cortez, CO and Blanding, UT	Hovenweep National Monument		Cutthroat Castle, the largest of the remains, is located on the north side of the stream. Cutthroat is unique among the units due to the lack of a spring, the numerous kivas and the fact that much of the architecture sits below the rim.	
Goodman Point (Site ID 5MT604)	Ancestral Puebloan	Pueblo II, Pueblo III	Between Cortez, CO and Blanding, UT	Hovenweep National Monument		Goodman Point group, the largest and easternmost village, contains small and large clusters of pueblo buildings built partially underground. It was most heavily populated in between 1150-1300, the Pueblo III period. Earlier residents include Basketmakers from 200-450 and during the second Pueblo period 900-1150. (Note: The Hovenweep Visitor's Guide published by the National Park Service does not include Goodman Point,)	
Hackberry and Horseshoe group	Ancestral Puebloan	Pueblo III	Between Cortez, CO and Blanding, UT	Hovenweep National Monument		Hackberry was a medium-sized Pueblo III village in the east fork of Bridge Canyon. About 250 to 350 inhabitants are thought to have resided in the Hackberry Group. Located about 500 yards away, the Horseshoe group consists of four pueblo buildings that for a U-shape. Horseshoe Ruin had a dam at the rim to create a reservoir. Horseshoe House is a D-shaped structure containing three rooms surrounding a possible central kiva. The architectural style suggests ceremonial or public use. About 800 years ago the buildings were constructed with "precisely fit" stones and set with mortar of sand, ash, clay and water.	
Holly Group	Ancestral Puebloan		Between Cortez, CO and Blanding, UT	Hovenweep National Monument		The Holly group is located at the head of Keeley Canyon. Holly is the site known for a rock art panel that has been interpreted as a summer solstice marker. The five named buildings at the site are Curved Wall House, Great House, Holly Tower, Isolated Boulder House and Tilted Tower.	
Hovenweep Castle	Ancestral Puebloan		Between Cortez, CO and Blanding, UT	Hovenweep National Monument			
Hovenweep House	Ancestral Puebloan		Between Cortez, CO and Blanding, UT	Hovenweep National Monument			
Rim Rock House	Ancestral Puebloan		Between Cortez, CO and Blanding, UT	Hovenweep National Monument			
Stronghold House	Ancestral Puebloan		Between Cortez, CO and Blanding, UT	Hovenweep National Monument			
Square Tower	Ancestral Puebloan		Between Cortez, CO and Blanding, UT	Hovenweep National Monument		Square Tower group is the largest collection of pueblo buildings at Hovenweep and was populated with up to 500 people. It is located in Little Ruin Canyon which is made up of Square Tower, Tower Point, and Twin Towers ruin groups. Towers at Hovenweep were built in a variety of shapes; D-shapes, squares, ovals and circles and for several purposes, including tool and grinding work areas, kivas for ritual functions, residential rooms and storage. Towers have limited access, contain few windows and many have narrow slots or peepholes placed in the walls. The slots and doors of Hovenweep Castle, in Square Tower Group, have been shown to define an apparent solar calendar. The building is aligned so that light is channeled through openings into the building at sunset of the summer solstice, the winter solstice and the spring and fall equinox. The light falls in a predictable pattern on interior door lintels.	
Twin Towers	Ancestral Puebloan		Between Cortez, CO and Blanding, UT	Hovenweep National Monument			

==== McElmo Drainage Unit ====
The McElmo Drainage Unit, located in Montezuma and Dolores Counties, consists of tributaries of McElmo Creek, situated north of the northern slopes of Mesa Verde and Ute Mountain, that is part of the northern San Juan River drainage. For Sand Canyon, see the Canyons of the Ancients and for Ansel Hall, see Dolores County.

Site name	Pueblo peoples	Period	Nearest town (modern name)	Location	Type	Description	Photo
Albert Porter Pueblo (Site ID 5MT123)	Ancestral Puebloan	Pueblo II, Pueblo III	Yellow Jacket	Private owner	Great house	Albert Porter Pueblo, also known by its Site ID and as Hedrick Ruin, was a small puebloan North San Juan village. See the Crow Canyon Archaeological Center.	
Unnamed (Site ID 5MT4700)	Ancestral Puebloan	Pueblo III	Yellow Jacket			There was one occupation from 1200–1250 of the Mesa Verde culture site.	
Bass site (Site ID 5MT136)	Ancestral Puebloan	Pueblo II	Yellow Jacket	Federal owner		There was one occupation with Great Houses at the Bass Site from 1080–1150, with its peak period about 1125. Based upon reporting to the Colorado Historical Society, occupancy extended into the early 13th century. The North San Juan pueblo site was added to the National Register of Historic Places for Montezuma County, Colorado in 1999.	
Cannonball Ruins (Site ID 5MT338)	Ancestral Puebloan	Late Pueblo II, Pueblo III	Cortez	Private owner		Cannonball Ruins, part of the Great Pueblo Period of the McElmo Drainage Unit, was occupied from 1140-1300. The large settlement had architectural characteristics similar to the nearby Hovenweep pueblos. The site was first excavated in 1908 by Sylvanus Morley. Cannonball Ruins has been listed on the Colorado State Register of Historical Properties and the National Register for Historic Places since 1997.	
James A. Lancaster Site (Site ID 5MT4803)	Ancestral Puebloan	Basketmaker, Pueblo I-III	Pleasant View	Private owner		Ruins also called Clawson Ruins were of the Pueblo tradition from the broad periods of 1-1499 AD [Pueblo people left Montezuma County area by 1300.] The previous village was added to the National Register of Historic Places in 1980.	
Joe Ben Wheat Site Complex (Site ID 5MT.16722)	Ancestral Puebloan	Pueblo II, Pueblo III	Yellow Jacket			Ruins from about 1075-1300. The site is a large multi-component site with 90 rooms and 14 kivas.	
Mitchell Springs Archeological Site (Site ID 5MT.10991)	Ancestral Puebloan	Basketmaker, Pueblo I, Pueblo II	Cortez	Private owner		Ruins from 500 - 1000, also known as the Mitchell Springs Ruin Group, is a Northern San Juan pueblo. It was added to the National Register of Historic Places in Montezuma County in 2001. Ruins of 9 medium-sized pueblos from the Basketmaker II period to late Pueblo III. Occupying up to 1,000 people the pueblo had a total of 300 rooms, 35 kivas and towers.	
Mud Springs Pueblo (Site ID 5MT4466)	Ancestral Puebloan	Pueblo III	Cortez	Private owner		Ruins, also called Toltec Springs, was occupied from 1200–1250, with its peak period about 1225. The community had reservoirs and construction with double or triple walls. The pueblo site was added to the National Register of Historic Places in 1982,	
Pigge Site (Site ID 5MT4802)	Ancestral Puebloan	Basketmaker, Pueblo I-III	Pleasant View	Private owner		There was an occupation, with roads, at the Pigge Site from 1175–1225, with its peak period about 1200. The National Register of Historic Places reports occupation through the broad periods of AD 1 - 1499 [by 1300 puebloan people from southwestern Colorado had migrated out of their pueblos.] The site was added to the National Register of Historic Places in 1980.	
Roy's Ruin (Site ID 5MT3930)	Ancestral Puebloan	Pueblo III	Cortez			Roy's Ruin, part of the Great Pueblo Period of the McElmo Drainage Unit, was occupied in the early 13th century. It is a classic Prudden Unit. The pueblo was built with masonry construction in roomblocks. The small site had a tower, kiva and a midden. Roy's Ruin has been listed on the Colorado State Register of Historical Properties and the National Register for Historic Places since 1992.	
Seven Towers Pueblo (5MT1000)	Ancestral Puebloan	Pueblo III	Yellow Jacket	Federal owner		The Northern San Juan pueblo ruins from about 1150-1300 was added to the National Register of Historic Places in 1999.	
Wallace Ruin (Site ID 5MT5670)	Ancestral Puebloan	Pueblo II, Pueblo III	Cortez	Private		Wallace Ruin, was a Northern San Juan and Chaco pueblo inhabited during the broad 1000 to 1499 period [Ancient Pueblo People left southwestern Colorado by 1300]. It was added to the National Register of Historic Places in 2005.	
Woods Canyon Pueblo (Site ID 5MT.11842)	Ancestral Puebloan	Pueblo II, Pueblo III	Yellow Jacket	Federal	Great house	Woods Canyon Pueblo, also known as Wood Canyon Ruin, was a Northern San Juan pueblo inhabited during the broad 1000 to 1499 period [Ancient Pueblo People left southwestern Colorado by 1300]. It was added to the National Register of Historic Places in 1999. Ruins consisting of as many as 200 rooms, 50 kivas, and 16 towers, and possibly a plaza.	
Yellow Jacket Pueblo (Site ID 5MT5)	Ancestral Puebloan	Pueblo II, Pueblo III	Yellow Jacket	Private owner.	Great house	Yellowjacket pueblo experienced two periods of occupation. The first occurred between 1075 and 1150, with peak residency in 1125. The next period occurred between 1175 and 1250. The peak of the second period occurred in 1225. The community had Great Houses, Great kivas, reservoirs and roads. Yellow Jacket pueblo was a village of the Mesa Verde culture was added to the National Register of Historic Places in 1985. Covering 100 acres, the pueblo contains at least 195 kivas (including a probable great kiva), 19 towers, a possible Chaco-era great house, and as many as 1,200 surface rooms. See the Crow Canyon Archaeological Center.	

==== Mesa Verde ====
Mesa Verde National Park (Site ID 5MT.9790) is listed in the National and State Registers of Historic places.

Site name	Pueblo peoples	Period	Nearest town (modern name)	Location	Type	Description	Photo
Balcony House	Ancestral Puebloan		Cortez	Mesa Verde National Park	Great house	Ruins. Set on a high ledge facing east, Balcony House with 45 rooms and 2 kivas, which would have been cold for its residents in the winter. The modern visitor enters by climbing a 32-foot ladder and a crawling through a 12-foot tunnel. The exit, a series of toe-holds in a cleft of the cliff, was believed to be the only entry and exit route for the cliff dwellers, which made the small village was easy to defend. One log was dated at 1278 so it was likely built not long before the Mesa Verde people migrated out of the area. Visitors can enter Balcony House through ranger guided tours. This photo is of an Emmett Harryson, a Navajo, at a T-shaped doorway at Balcony House (1929).	
Cliff Palace	Ancestral Puebloan		Cortez	Mesa Verde National Park		This multi-storied ruin, the largest and best-known of the cliff dwellings in Mesa Verde, is located in the largest cave in the center of the Great Mesa. It was south and southwest facing, providing greater warmth from the sun in the winter. The site had 217 rooms, including storage rooms, open courts, walkways, and 23 kivas. Many of the rooms were brightly painted.	
Fire Temple	Ancestral Puebloan		Cortez	Mesa Verde National Park			
Long House	Ancestral Puebloan		Cortez	Mesa Verde National Park	Cliff dwellings	Ruins. Located on the Wetherill Mesa, Long House is the 2nd largest village for about 150 people. The 150 rooms are not clustered like the standard cliff dwellings, nor is it one of the most elegant set of buildings; Stones were used without shaping for fit and stability. Two overhead ledges contain more rooms. One ledge seems to include an overlook with small holes in the wall to see the rest of the village below. A spring is accessible within several hundred feet and seeps are located in the rear of the village.	
Mesa Verde Reservoirs	Ancestral Puebloan		Cortez	Mesa Verde National Park		A Historic Civil Engineering Landmark. These ancient reservoirs, built by the Ancient Puebloans, were named a National Civil Engineering Historic Landmark on September 26, 2004.	
Mug House	Ancestral Puebloan		Cortez	Mesa Verde National Park		This ruin situated on Wetherill Mesa was professionally excavated in the late 1960s by archaeologist Arthur Rohn. The structure contains 94 rooms, in four levels, including a large kiva, with simple vertical walls and masonry pilasters. This ceremonial structure has a keyhole shape, due to a recess behind the fireplace and a deflector, that is considered an element of the Mesa Verde style. The rooms clustered around the kiva formed part of the courtyard, indicating the kiva would have been roofed.	
Oak Tree House	Ancestral Puebloan		Cortez	Mesa Verde National Park		Ruins. Oak Tree House and neighboring Fire Temple can be visited via a 2-hour ranger-guided hike.	
Spruce Tree House	Ancestral Puebloan		Cortez	Mesa Verde National Park		Ruins. Spruce Tree House is the 3rd largest village, within several hundred feet of a spring, had 130 rooms and 8 kivas. Because of its protective location, it is well preserved. The short trail to Spruce House begins at the Chapin Mesa Archeological Museum.	
Square Tower House	Ancestral Puebloan	Pueblo III	Cortez	Mesa Verde National Park		The Square Tower House is one of the stops on the Mesa Top Loop Road diving tour. The tower that gives this site its name is the tallest structure in Mesa Verde. This cliff dwelling was occupied between 1200 and 1300.	

==== Towaoc area ====
Site name	Pueblo peoples	Period	Nearest town (modern name)	Location	Type	Description	Photo
Cowboy Wash (Site ID 5MT10010)	Ancestral Puebloan	Pueblo III	Towaoc			The site is dated between approximately 1150 and 1175 A.D. It is located on the south slopes of Ute Mountain. Some archeologists believe that the site was settled by immigrants from Chaco Canyon, or the Chuska Mountains.	
Ute Mountain Ute Tribe (Site ID 5MT.4342)	Ancestral Puebloan	Pueblo I, Pueblo II, Pueblo III	Towaoc			Ute Mountain Ute Mancos Canyon Historic District, located on the Ute Mountain Ute Tribe reservation, was added to the National Register of Historic Places in 1972.	
Yucca House (Site ID 5MT5006)	Ancestral Puebloan	Pueblo II, Pueblo III	Towaoc	Yucca House National Monument	Pueblo village	There were two occupations at Yucca House: 1) 1080-1150, with its peak period about 1125 and 2) 1225-1275, with its peak in 1250. The community had Great kivas and Great Houses. Two unexcavated settlement areas covered in vegetation include: 1) Western Complex was a large pueblo of up to 600 rooms, 100 kivas and a giant, perhaps community, kiva. A spring runs through the complex. A large building, Upper House, was made of adobe. 2) Lower House is an L-shaped pueblo with a plaza, 8 rooms and a large kiva.	

==== Other ====
The sites are sorted by nearest town and site name.

Site name	Pueblo peoples	Period	Nearest town (modern name)	Location	Type	Description	Photo
O'Brien Site (Site ID 5MT.5518)	Ancestral Puebloan	Pueblo II	Dolores			Ruins from 1075 - 1150. On the Colorado State Register of Historic Properties.	
Bement Site (Site ID 5MT.4388)	Ancestral Puebloan	Pueblo I, Pueblo II	Mancos			Bement Site is a Colorado State Register of Historic Properties site, representing the first and second Pueblo periods. Between 750-850 there was one shelter on the site. About 150 years later, a group of six structures were inhabited from 1000 to 1150.	
Lost Canyon Archeological District (Site ID 5MT.10435)	Ancestral Puebloan	Pueblo II, Pueblo III	Mancos	Federal owner		Ruins from 1050-1300 or earlier was Mesa Verde culture pueblo. It was added to the National Register of Historic Places in 1988.	
Puzzle House (Site ID 5MT.11787)	Ancestral Puebloan	Basketmaker, Pueblo II-III	Pleasant View			Puzzle House, is a pueblo settlement occupied three times, first about 650 and two occupations between 1075-1225. The site is on the state register.	
Shields Pueblo	Ancestral Puebloan					Ruins in southwestern Colorado.	

=== Montrose County ===
Site name	Pueblo peoples	Period	Nearest town (modern name)	Location	Type	Description	Photo
Dolores Cave (Site ID 5MN.915)	Gateway	Basketmaker and Pueblo periods	Uravan			The rock shelter is listed on the State register. Corn dated at 1500 found at the site provides evidence that some people from the Ancient Pueblo periods may have remained in the area and farmed corn.	
Tabeguache Pueblo (Site ID 5MN.1609)	Gateway	Pueblo II	Nucla			Tabeguache Pueblo is an example of an early, dispersed Ancient Pueblo settlement, inhabited about 1100 and later abandoned.	
Tabeguache Cave II (Site ID 5MN.890)	Gateway	Basketmaker, Pueblo I-III	Uravan			Tabeguache Cave II is a large prehistoric rock shelter occupied from about 600 - 1500. There is also a Tabeguache Cave and two other rock shelters near Nucla, Colorado.	

== Gallery ==
Map of Ancient Pueblo People (Anasazi) regions, including the northern Mesa Verde region and the southern Chaco Canyon region.

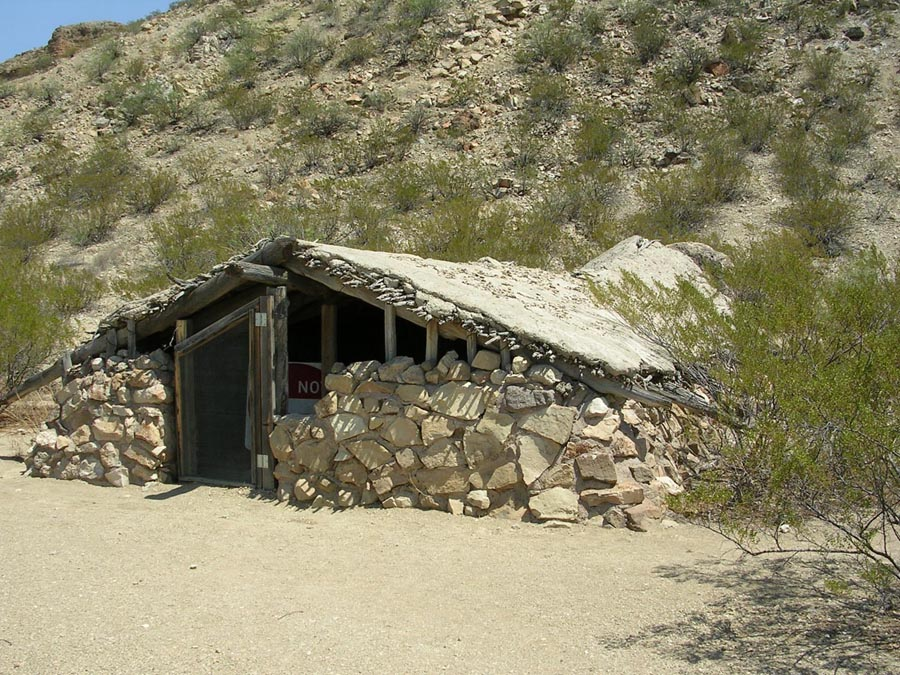
A jacal in Big Bend National Park.

== See also ==
- Bibliography of Colorado
- Geography of Colorado
- History of Colorado
- Index of Colorado-related articles
- List of Colorado-related lists
  - List of prehistoric sites in Colorado
- Outline of Colorado
  - Outline of Colorado prehistory
- Trail of the Ancients
