= Yellow Jacket, Colorado =

Unincorporated community in Montezuma County, CO, USA

- Unincorporated community
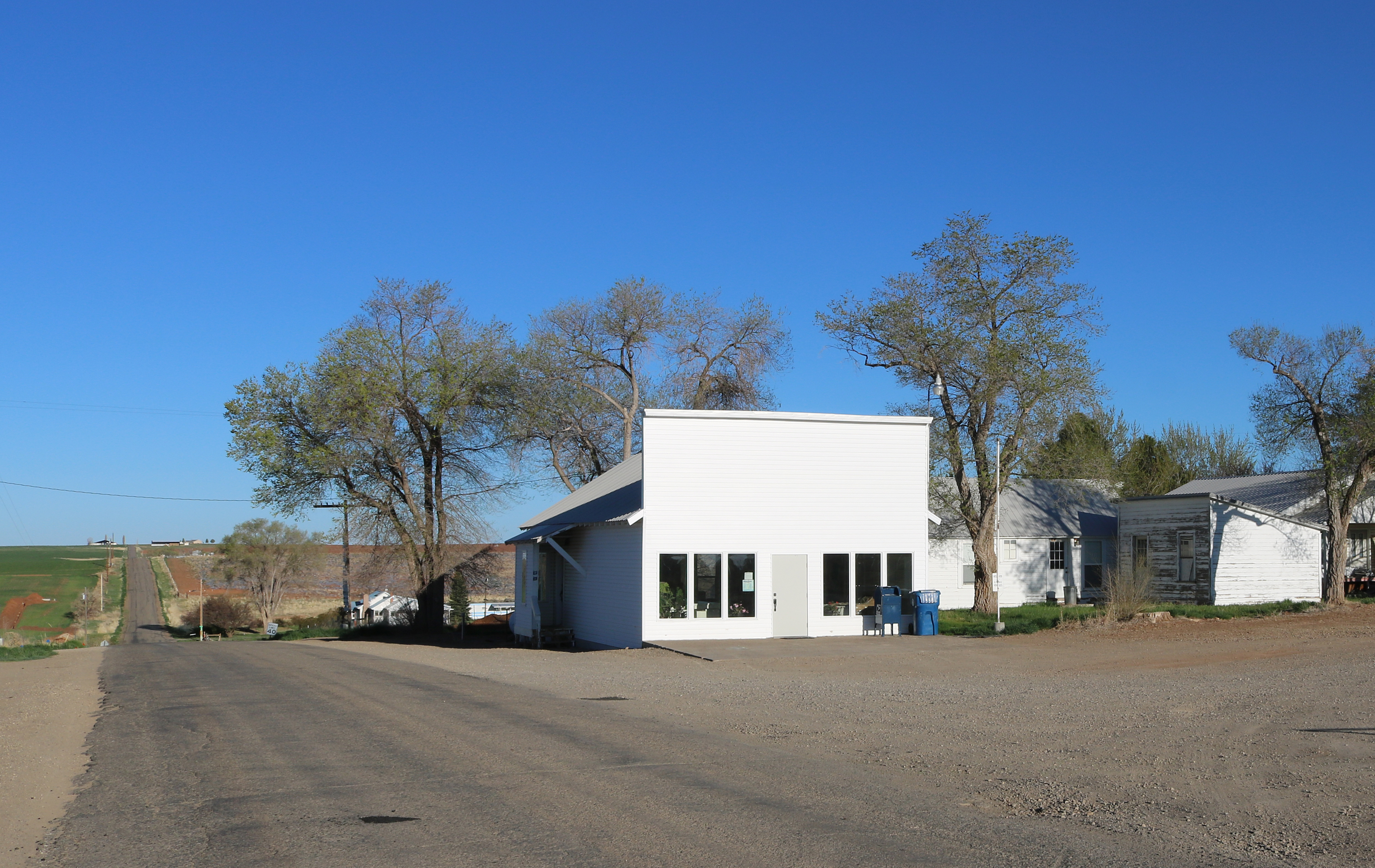
- County Road Y (left) and the post office in Yellow Jacket.

- Location within Colorado Location within the United States
- Coordinates: 37°32′04″N 108°43′02″W
- Country: United States
- State: Colorado
- County: Montezuma County
- Elevation: 6,900 ft (2,100 m)
- Time zone: UTC-7 (MST)
  - Summer (DST): UTC-6 (MDT)
- ZIP code: 81335
- Area code: 970
- GNIS feature ID: 176860

Yellow Jacket is an unincorporated community and a U.S. post office located in Montezuma County, Colorado, United States. The Yellow Jacket post office has the ZIP Code 81335.

== History ==
A post office called Yellow Jacket has been in operation since 1914. The community was named for the abundance of yellow jackets near the original town site.

There are a number of prehistoric archaeological sites of the Ancient Pueblo People (Anasazi) during the Pueblo II Era and Pueblo III Eras near Yellow Jacket that are listed on the National Register of Historic Places and the Colorado State Register of Historic Properties:

- Albert Porter Pueblo inhabited in the late 12th century - early 13th century.
- Bass Site occupied late 12th century - early 13th century.
- Joe Ben Wheat Site Complex occupied from 1075-1300. The site was a large multi-component site with 90 rooms and 14 kivas.
- Seven Towers Pueblo inhabited from 1150-1300.
- Woods Canyon Pueblo occupied in the 13th century.
- Yellow Jacket Pueblo, one of the largest Ancient Pueblo communities in the area.
- Unnamed site 5MT4700.

== See also ==
- Old Spanish National Historic Trail
- Trail of the Ancients
