= Pueblo I period =

Era in the history of the Pueblo peoples

Map of Ancestral Puebloans in the American Southwest and Mexico

The Pueblo I period (750-900) was the first period in which the Ancestral Puebloans began living in pueblo structures and experienced an evolution in architecture, artistic expression, and water conservation.

Pueblo I, a Pecos Classification, is similar to the early "Developmental Pueblo period" of 750 to 1100. It is preceded by the Basketmaker III period, and is followed by the Pueblo II period.

== Architecture ==
People constructed and lived in pueblos, which were surface level, flat-roofed homes. At the beginning of the period pueblos were made with jacal construction. Wooden posts were used to create a frame to supported woven material and a covering of mud. Later in the period, stone slabs were sometimes used around the dwelling foundation.

The pueblos made of several rooms that formed a straight row or in a crescent shape. Sometimes they built the dwellings two rows thick with a combination of living rooms with fire pits and storage rooms.

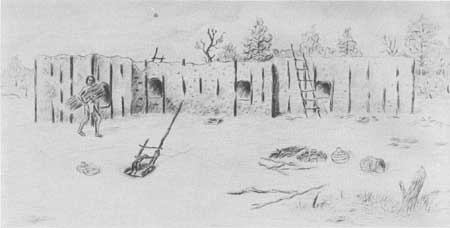
Reconstructed image of a post and adobe village in Mesa Verde Source: National Park Service

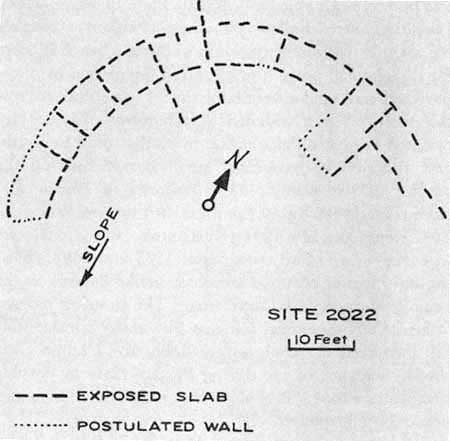
Sketch of Pueblo I crescent-shaped village (Mesa Verde site 2022) Source: National Park Service

J. Richard Ambler describes how Pueblo I architectural changes reflect societal changes:

The change in village layout would seem to reflect a basic change in village social organization from a loosely integrated group of related families to a tightly integrated group, and also a change in ceremonial organization from a largely shamanistic and individualistic orientation to communal ceremonies organized around the calendrical round.

During this period round pit-houses began to evolve into ceremonial kivas.

== Communities ==
There was some variability in when and how communities transitioned into and out of the Pueblo I period. Some communities might not have had some of the external or climatic pressures that forced rapid resettlement. As a result, during the early Pueblo I period, there were some communities that lived in Basket Maker settlements.

The Pueblo I villages were larger than the settlements of the preceding Basket Maker period; In the Four Corners region the average of 5 to 10 pit-house per settlement rose to 20 to 30 pit-houses per community. In some cases, the Pueblo I communities were quite large. The southeastern Utah's Alkali Ridge had about 130 rooms built on the surface, with 16 pit-houses and 2 kivas.

The most advanced communities in the Chaco Canyon region had "great houses", roads and elaborate kivas.

- Dolores River Valley. Although there were some dispersed settlements and pit-houses, there was a general trend to the development of aboveground structures and villages like those found in the Dolores River valley in southwestern Colorado. The aboveground structures were built in contiguous clusters of rooms, often with windows facing south. Many of the rooms were used for storage. People began to socialize at pit-houses used for ceremonies, which evolved into kivas. Rituals were developed as forms of prayer for rain, sunshine and a successful harvest. Construction materials for buildings included stone and wooden posts, and less frequently adobe, masonry and wood.
- San Juan River Valley. A Piedra phase settlement in the San Juan River Valley, New Mexico was surrounded by large walls, or palisades. Evidence shows that there was an incident that resulted in destruction of the village and death of many inhabitants. Since the incident occurred during a period of prolonged drought, one theory is that the village was raided for its stores of food. It was soon after this destruction of the Pietra village that many communities built Pueblo I structures on higher, more easily defended, ground. There was a similar set of circumstances during the Basketmaker III Era near the present town of Pleasant View, Colorado.
- Chaco Canyon. Great houses were built in the mid-9th century at Chaco Canyon. The structures were much larger than previous dwellings. The multi-storied buildings had high ceilings, rooms with three or four times the space of domestic dwellings and elaborate kivas. Advancements in masonry techniques resulted in strong, beautiful structures. Roads were also built. Other sites in the Canyon, similar to other Ancient pueblo communities of the time, were smaller settlements of pueblo buildings. Storage rooms were made of Jacal.

== Agriculture ==
By the Pueblo I period, the Ancient Pueblo people were reliant upon agriculture and they faced periods of lower rates of precipitation, like the major drought from 850–900 in the Petrified Forest National Park. It is likely that people also settled on the mesas and ridges to benefit from heavier winter snowfall and summer precipitation. Water management and conservation techniques, including the use of reservoirs and silt-retaining dams also emerged during this period to efficiently utilize their water supply. Large earthenware vessels, sealed with stone lids, were used to store harvested corn and protect it from rodents and rotting.

People also hunted, trapped and gathered wild nuts, plants and fruit.

== Pottery ==
In the transition from the Basket Maker period, pottery became more versatile, including ollas, pitchers, ladles, bowls, jars and dishware. Plain and neckbanded gray pottery was a standard at Pueblo I sites. White pottery with black designs, the pigments coming from plants, and red ware emerged during this period.

Communities with low-yield harvests often traded pottery for maize. As a result, there was an emergence of beautifully designed black-on-white pottery to promote a successful trade.

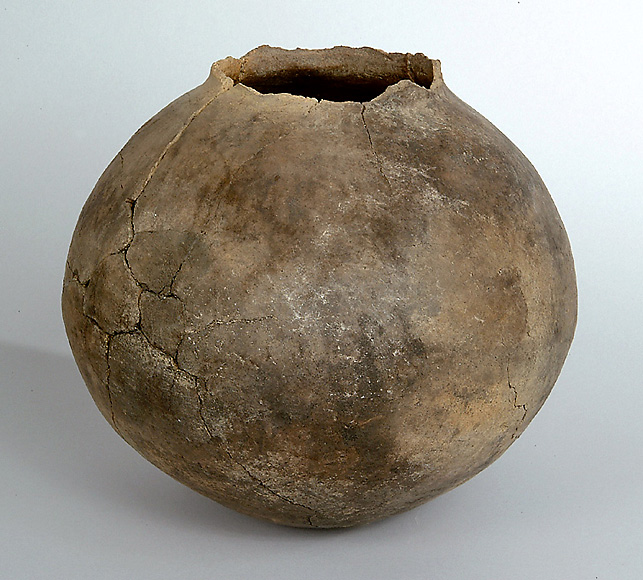
Common gray ware pottery

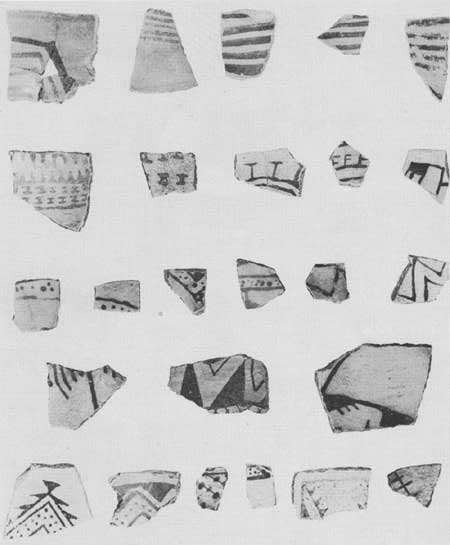
Basketmaker III – Pueblo I Decorated Bowl Sherds.
Source: National Park Service.

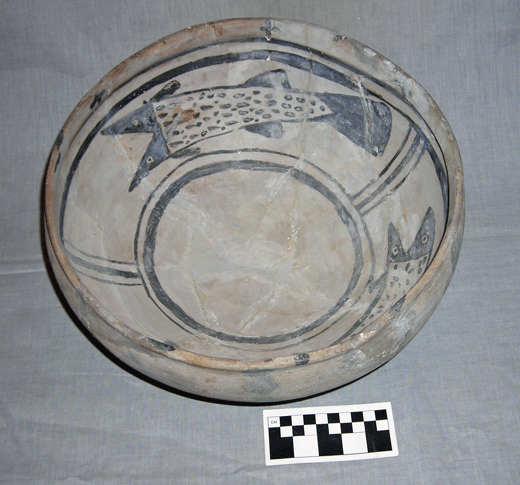
Black on White Biscuit A bowl

== Other material goods ==
The people continued to use many of the materials goods from the preceding Basketmaker, some examples of material goods in this Pueblo period are:

- stone tools, such as axes and knives
- bone awls used for weaving yucca mats, sandals and baskets
- pottery
- Manos and metates to grind corn and plants
- digging sticks
- bow and arrows
- yucca woven items, such as sandals and rope
- blankets made of turkey feathers and yucca
- clothing made from woven cotton (cotton obtained through trade)

Hard-backed cradle boards emerged during this period to tightly and safely hold babies' necks while their mothers worked. The pressure flattened the back of the youngsters' heads, reflected in changed skulls following this period.

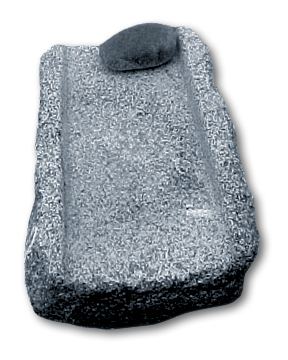
Metate for grinding plants, food or seeds

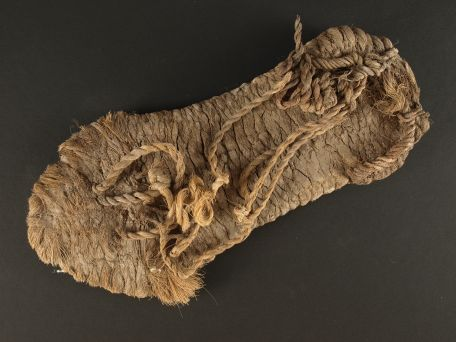
Sandal from 700–1100. Source: National Park Service

== Cultural groups and periods ==
The cultural groups of this period include:

- Ancestral Puebloans – southern Utah, southern Colorado, northern Arizona and northern and central New Mexico.
- Hohokam – southern Arizona.
- Mogollon – southeastern Arizona, southern New Mexico and northern Mexico.
- Patayan – western Arizona, California and Baja California.

== Notable Pueblo I sites ==
Arizona	Colorado	New Mexico	Utah
Cohonina; Glen Canyon; Navajo Pueblos; Petrified Forest	Canyons of the Ancients; Chimney Rock; Durango Rock Shelters; Hovenweep; La Plata River valley Mesa Verde; Ute Mountain	Canyon de Chelly	Glen Canyon; Hovenweep

== Gallery ==
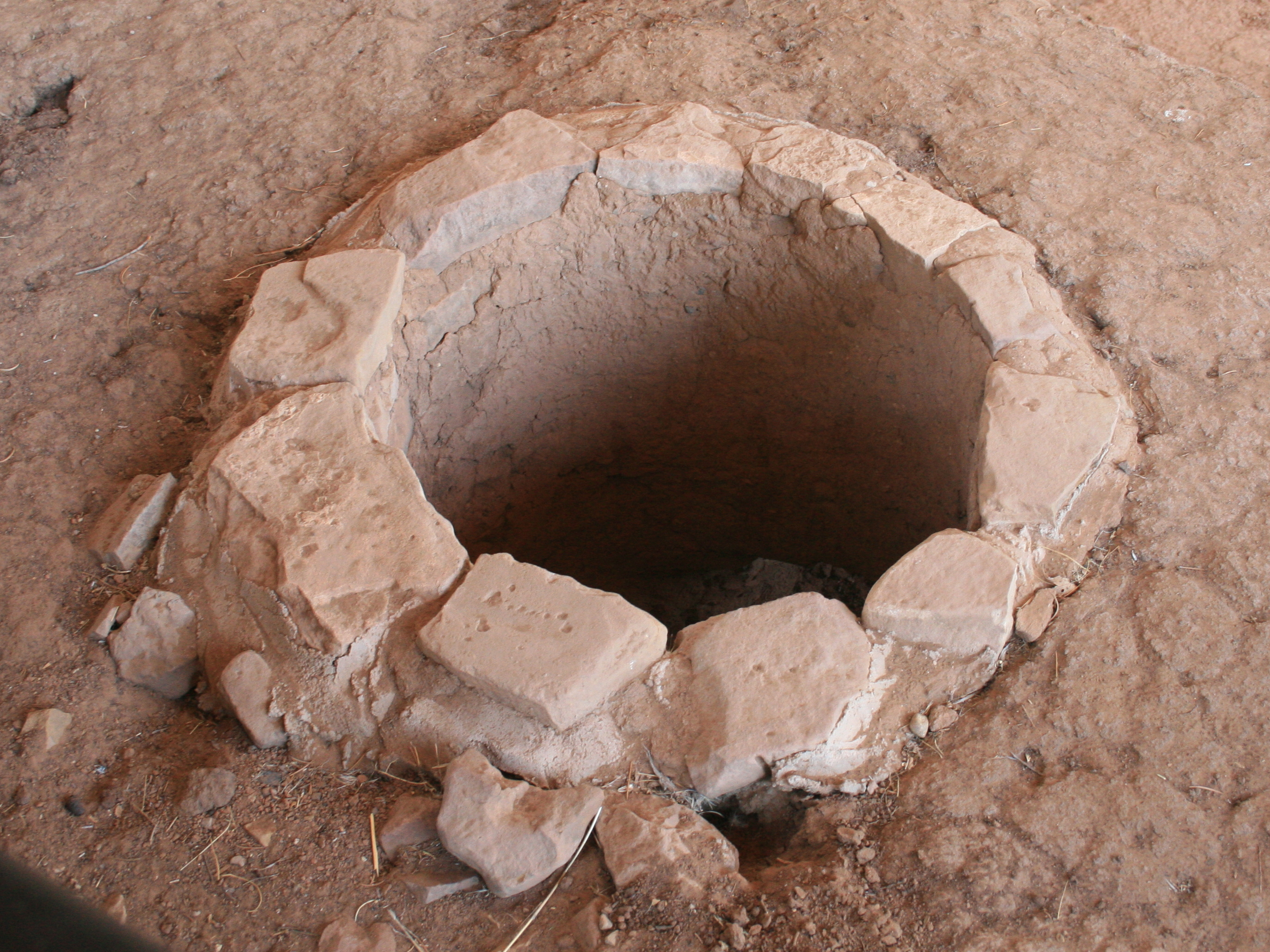
Mesa Verde National Park pit-house ventilator

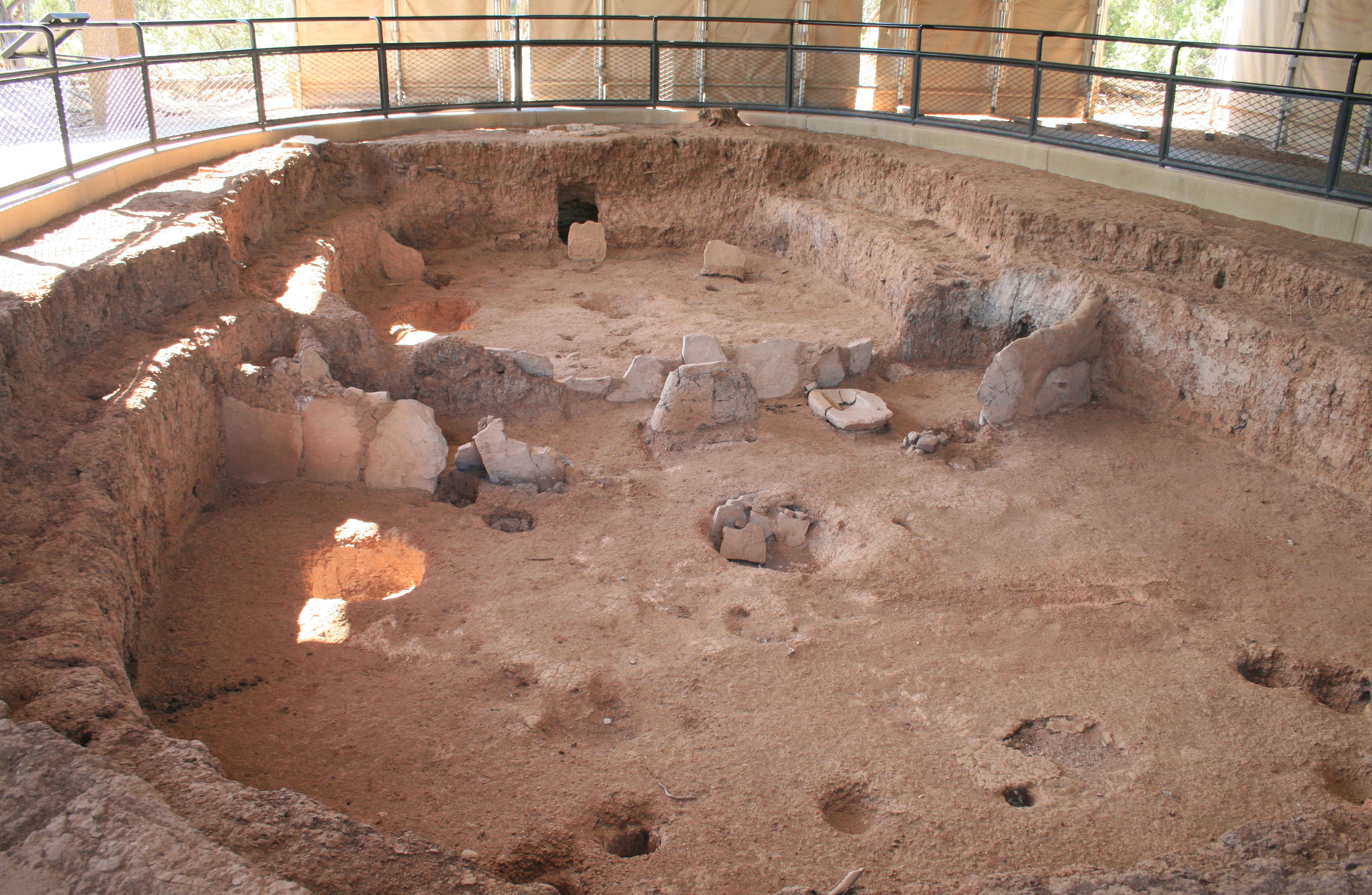
Mesa Verde National Park pit-house

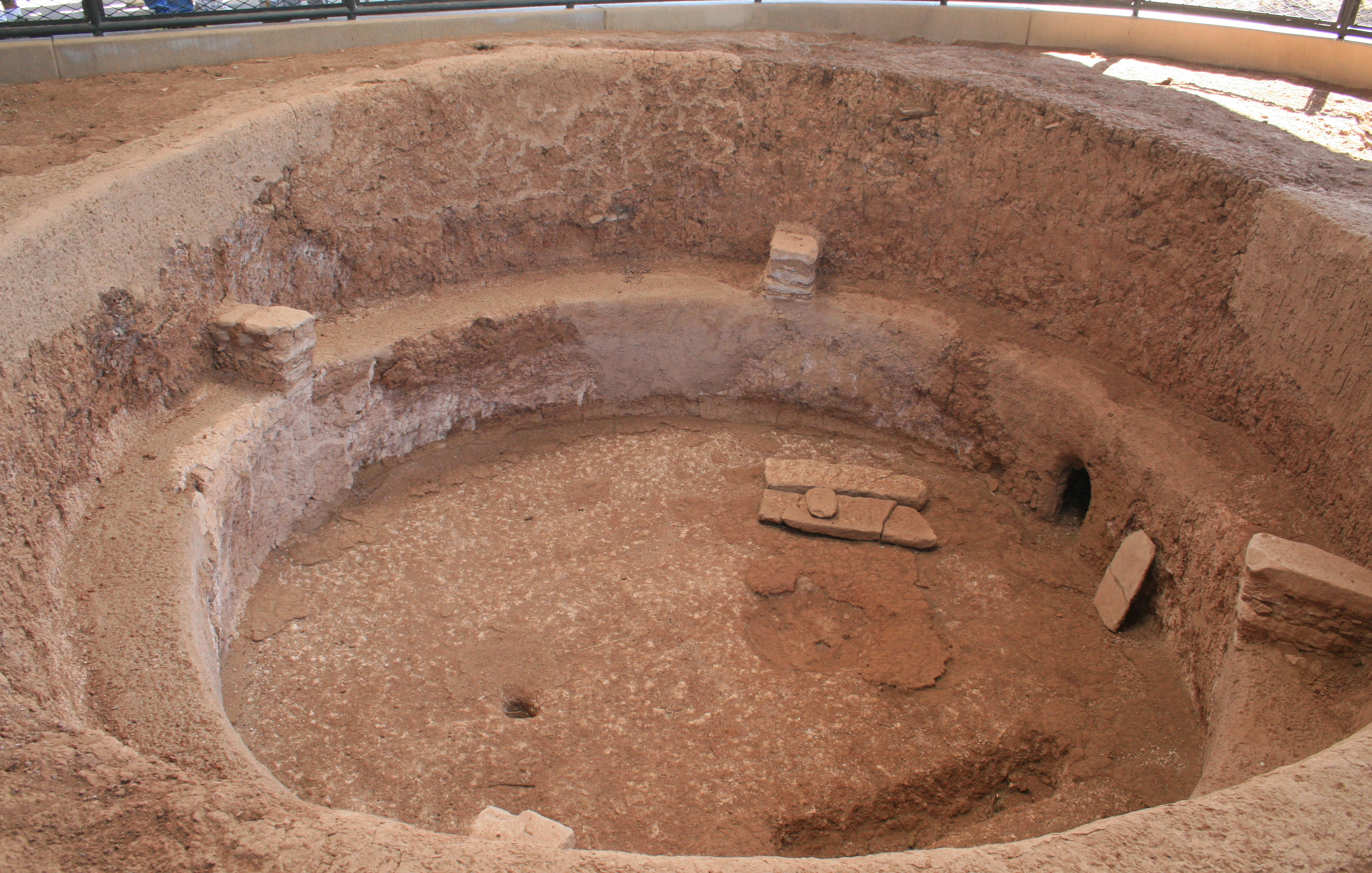
Example of an early kiva in Mesa Verde National Park
