= Basketmaker III period =

Ancient culture of the southwest United States

The Basketmaker III period (500 to 750 CE) also called the "Modified Basketmaker" period, was the third period in which ancient Pueblo people were cultivating food, began making pottery and living in more sophisticated clusters of pit-house dwellings. Hunting was easier with the adoption of the bow and arrow.

The Basketmaker III period is preceded by the Late Basketmaker II period, and is followed by the Pueblo I period.

== Architecture ==
In the Basketmaker III period, people continued to live in pit-houses, but the architecture changed. Now the houses were larger, included division on the space into sections, a large central hearth, addition of vestibules, and slabs of stone were used to line the walls.

Most pit-houses were built out in the open on tops of mesas. Pit-houses were built in a hole several feet deep between 8 and 20 feet (2.4 and 6.1 m) in diameter. A log frame was built to support side walls and a roof that were covered with woven reeds, grass and, lastly, mud for weatherproofing. In the center of a roof was an opening used for ventilation and an entrance to the dwelling. Some pit-houses had an attached storage room.

== Communities ==
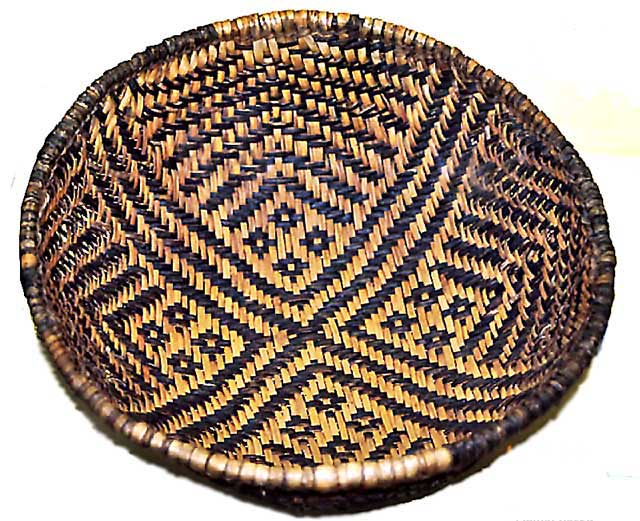
Basket, Basketmaker Culture, Ancestral Pueblo

Map of Ancient Pueblo People in the American Southwest and Mexico

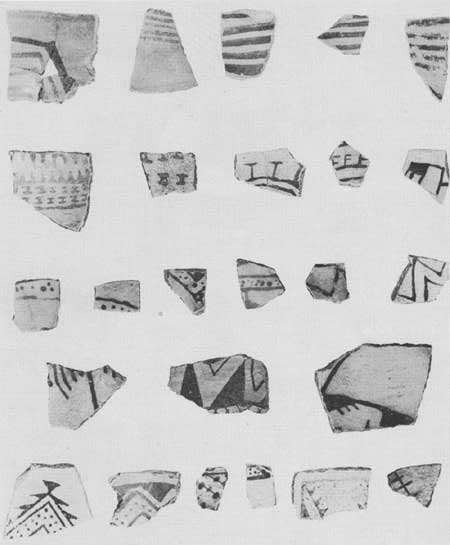
Mesa Verde National Park Basketmaker III – Pueblo I Decorated Bowl Shreds

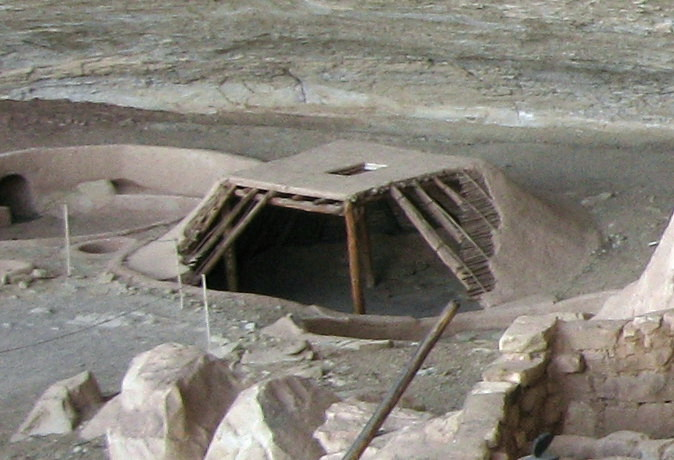
Example of a pit-house

Mesa Verde. Small groupings of pit houses were built on the top of mesas.

Chaco Canyon. From about 450–700 CE more than 200 Basketmaker sites sat on Chaco Canyon mesas, ridges, and the canyon floor. The sites had clusters of 1–20 pit-houses. One of its villages, Shabik'eschee, was the type site for this period. Although most village sites were relatively small during this period, Shabik'eschee (about 550–700 CE) contained 18 pit-houses for an estimated 77 people, more than 50 storage pits, and a large pit-house used for celebration and rituals. This compares to an average settlement for 5 to 15 people. The large pit-house was likely a "great" kiva. Based on the number of extra pit-houses for storage, it is possible that the village was visited from nearby settlers.

Pleasant View, Colorado. There may have been pressure within the Basketmaker III communities to ensure their safety. Stockades encircled pit-houses in at least 11 sites within a 10 miles of Pleasant View, Colorado. The settlements (dated from 600–700 CE) could have been fenced to ensure safety of children or contain domesticated dogs and turkeys. It is considered is more likely that they were built as a defensive measure, based upon extensive collections of burnt artifacts from the sites. A theory is that other local people may have waged war having felt displaced by the number of new Basketmaker III settlements in the area.

== Culture and religion ==
During this period the social and political structure was likely informal, with heads of households making decisions by consensus.

Petroglyphs of people and animals were made in the Petrified Forest National Park during this period.

== Agriculture ==
Beans, squash and maize were cultivated in this period. The farm also include the raising of turkeys, both for feathers and a source of food. Food was kept in storage cists, below ground pits that were lined and covered with stone. People also hunted, trapped and gathered wild nuts, plants and fruit.

== Pottery ==
In the Basketmaker III period pottery was introduced which reduced the number of baskets that they made and eliminated the creation of woven bags. Simple, gray pottery was a more effective vessel for cooking, storage and carrying water. The people in the area of the Petrified Forest National Park made Adamana Brown pottery, considered the earliest pottery on the Colorado Plateau.

== Material goods ==
The Basketmaker people's skill at making baskets and weaving improves during this period. Part of their output includes bags, baskets, sandals, sashes and other woven items. Pitch-lined baskets held water where food was cooked by placing hot stones in a water-filled basket. Bows and arrows made hunting easier and thus the acquisition of hides for clothing. Spears and darts continued to be used, but with less regularity. Turkey feathers were woven into blankets and robes. Babies were carried in soft, non-deforming cradle boards.

Other common material goods of the time were:

- Yucca woven sandals and rope
- Stone axes, knives and other tools used to pound, scrape and cut.
- Stone metates and manos to grind corn
- Bones stitching awls and scrapers
- Nets and snares to trap small game
- Sticks for digging to plant seeds
- Cradleboards made from yucca, twigs and rabbit fur

== Cultural groups and periods ==
The cultural groups of this period include:

- Ancestral Puebloans – southern Utah, southern Colorado, northern Arizona and northern and central New Mexico.
- Hohokam – southern Arizona.
- Mogollon – southeastern Arizona, southern New Mexico and northern Mexico.
- Patayan – western Arizona, California and Baja California.

== Notable Basketmaker III sites ==
- Chaco Culture National Historical Park – New Mexico
- Darkmold Site – Colorado
- Durango Rock Shelters Archeology Site – Colorado (Basketmaker II type site)
- Grand Staircase–Escalante National Monument – Utah
- Grand Canyon area – Arizona
- Hovenweep National Monument – Colorado
- Kanab Creek area – Utah and Arizona
- Mesa Verde National Park – Colorado
- Petrified Forest National Park – Arizona
- Spring Creek Archeological District – Colorado
- Talus Village – Colorado
- Virgin Anasazi – Colorado Plateau of Nevada, Utah and Arizona

== Sources ==
- "Ancestral Pueblo culture | North American Indian culture".
