= Ancestral Puebloan dwellings =

Ancestral Puebloan homes

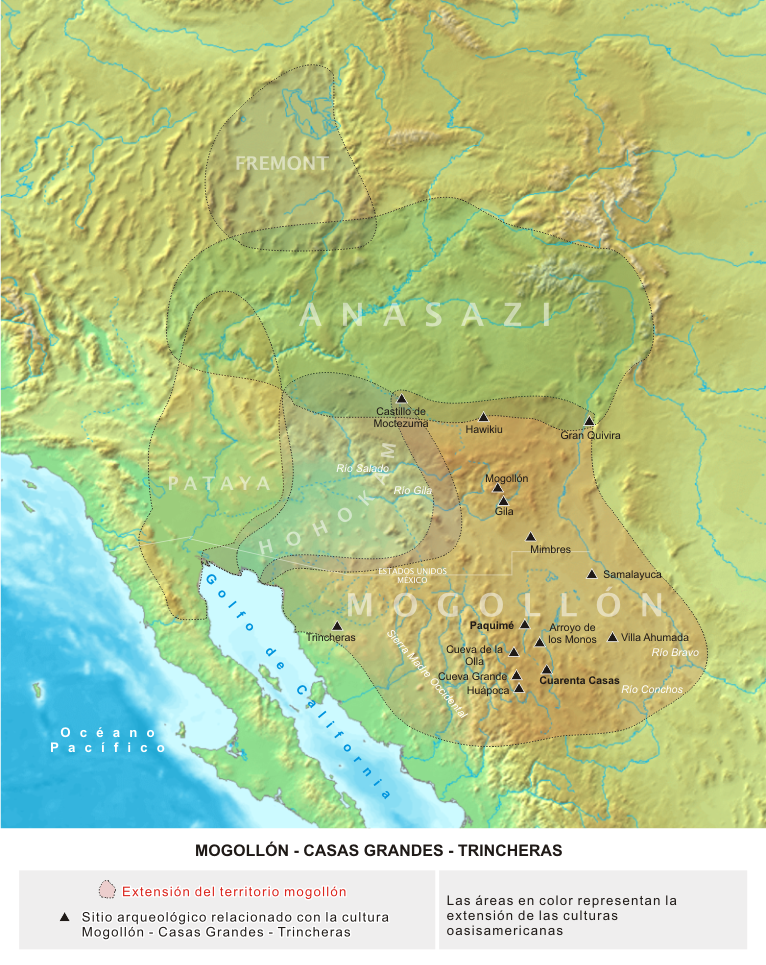
A map of ancestral Pueblo cultures

Hundreds of Ancestral Puebloan dwellings are found across the American Southwest. With almost all constructed well before 1492 CE, these Puebloan towns and villages are located throughout the geography of the Southwest.

Many of these dwellings included various defensive positions, like the high steep mesas such as at the ancient Mesa Verde complex or the present-day Acoma "Sky City" Pueblo. Earlier than 900 CE progressing past the 13th century, the population complexes appear to have been major cultural centers for the Pueblo peoples. There were also settlements scattered throughout the region of varying sizes.

== Cultures ==
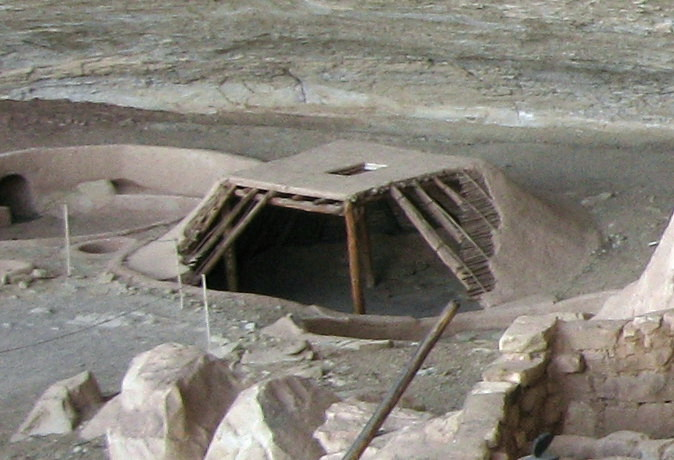
A reconstructed pit house at Mesa Verde.

=== Ancestral cultures ===
Ancestral Puebloans spanned Northern Arizona and New Mexico, Southern Colorado and Utah, and a part of Southeastern Nevada. They primarily lived north of the Patayan, Sinagua, Hohokam, Trincheras, Mogollon, and Casas Grandes cultures of the Southwest and south of the Fremont culture of the Great Basin .

=== Contemporary cultures ===
There are 21 federally recognized pueblos in the United States today. Rio Grande pueblos are known as eastern Pueblos; Zuni, Hopi, and sometimes Acoma and Laguna are known as western Pueblos.

- Hopi Tribe of Arizona
- Kewa Pueblo, New Mexico
- Ohkay Owingeh Pueblo, New Mexico
- Pueblo of Acoma, New Mexico
- Pueblo of Cochiti, New Mexico
- Pueblo of Isleta, New Mexico
- Pueblo of Jemez, New Mexico
- Pueblo of Laguna, New Mexico
- Pueblo of Nambe, New Mexico
- Pueblo of Picuris, New Mexico
- Pueblo of Pojoaque, New Mexico
- Pueblo of San Felipe, New Mexico
- Pueblo of San Ildefonso, New Mexico
- Pueblo of Sandia, New Mexico
- Pueblo of Santa Ana, New Mexico
- Pueblo of Santa Clara, New Mexico
- Pueblo of Taos, New Mexico
- Pueblo of Tesuque, New Mexico
- Pueblo of Zia, New Mexico
- Ysleta Del Sur Pueblo of Texas
- Zuni Tribe of the Zuni Reservation, New Mexico

== Geography ==
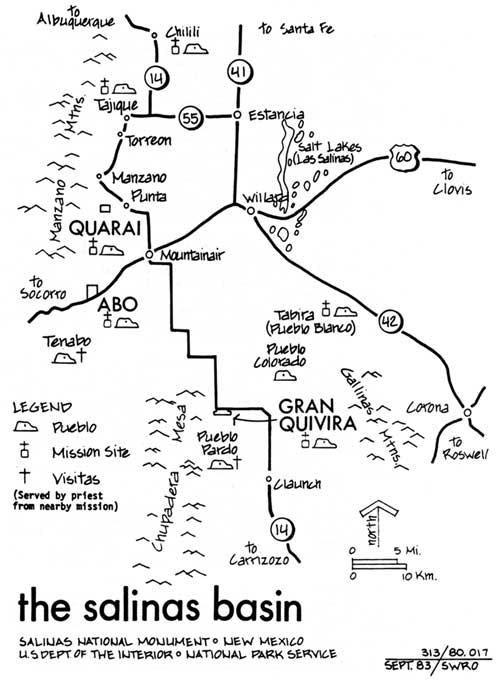
Dwellings of the Pueblo peoples in New Mexico's Salinas Basin.

The dwellings of the Pueblo peoples are located throughout the American Southwest and north central Mexico. The American states of New Mexico, Texas, Colorado, Utah, Nevada, and Arizona all have evidence of Pueblo peoples' dwellings; the Mexican states of Chihuahua and Sonora do as well.

== Eras ==
Map of Ancient Pueblo People (Anasazi) regions, including the northern Mesa Verde region and the southern Chaco Canyon region.

Archaeologists have agreed on three main periods of ancient occupation by Pueblo peoples throughout the Southwest called Pueblo I, Pueblo II, and Pueblo III.

- Pueblo I (750–900 CE). Pueblo buildings were built with stone, windows facing south, and in U, E and L shapes. The buildings were located more closely together and reflected deepening religious celebration. Towers were built near kivas and likely used for look-outs. Pottery became more versatile, not just for cooking, but now included pitchers, ladles, bowls, jars and dishware for food and drink. White pottery with black designs emerged, the pigments coming from plants. Water management and conservation techniques, including the use of reservoirs and silt-retaining dams also emerged during this period. Midway through this period, about 900 CE, the number of Hovenweep residential sites increased.
- Pueblo II (900–1150 CE). During the Pueblo II period there was an increase in population that resulted in creation of more than 10,000 sites in 150 years. Since much of the land was arid, the people supplemented their diet by hunting, foraging and trading pottery for food. By the end of the period, there were two-story dwellings made primarily of stone masonry, the presence of towers, and family and community kivas.
- Pueblo III (1150–1300 CE). Rohn and Ferguson, authors of Puebloan ruins of the Southwest, state that during the Pueblo III period there was a significant community change. Moving in from dispersed farmsteads into community centers at pueblos canyon heads or cliff dwellings on canyon shelves. Population peaked between 1200 and 1250 to more than 20,000 in the Mesa Verde region. By 1300 Ancient Pueblo People abandoned their settlements, as the result of climate changes and food shortage, and moved south to villages in Arizona and New Mexico.

== Architecture ==
The ancient population centers such as Chaco Canyon, Mesa Verde, and Bandelier for which the Ancestral Puebloans are renowned consisted of apartment-like complexes and structures made from stone, adobe mud, and other local material, or were carved into the sides of canyon walls.

The structures contained within these alcoves were mostly blocks of hard sandstone, held together and plastered with adobe mortar. Specific constructions had many similarities, but were generally unique in form due to the individual topography of different alcoves along the canyon walls.

Decorative motifs for these sandstone/mortar constructions, both cliff dwellings and otherwise, included T-shaped windows and doors.

=== Construction characteristics ===
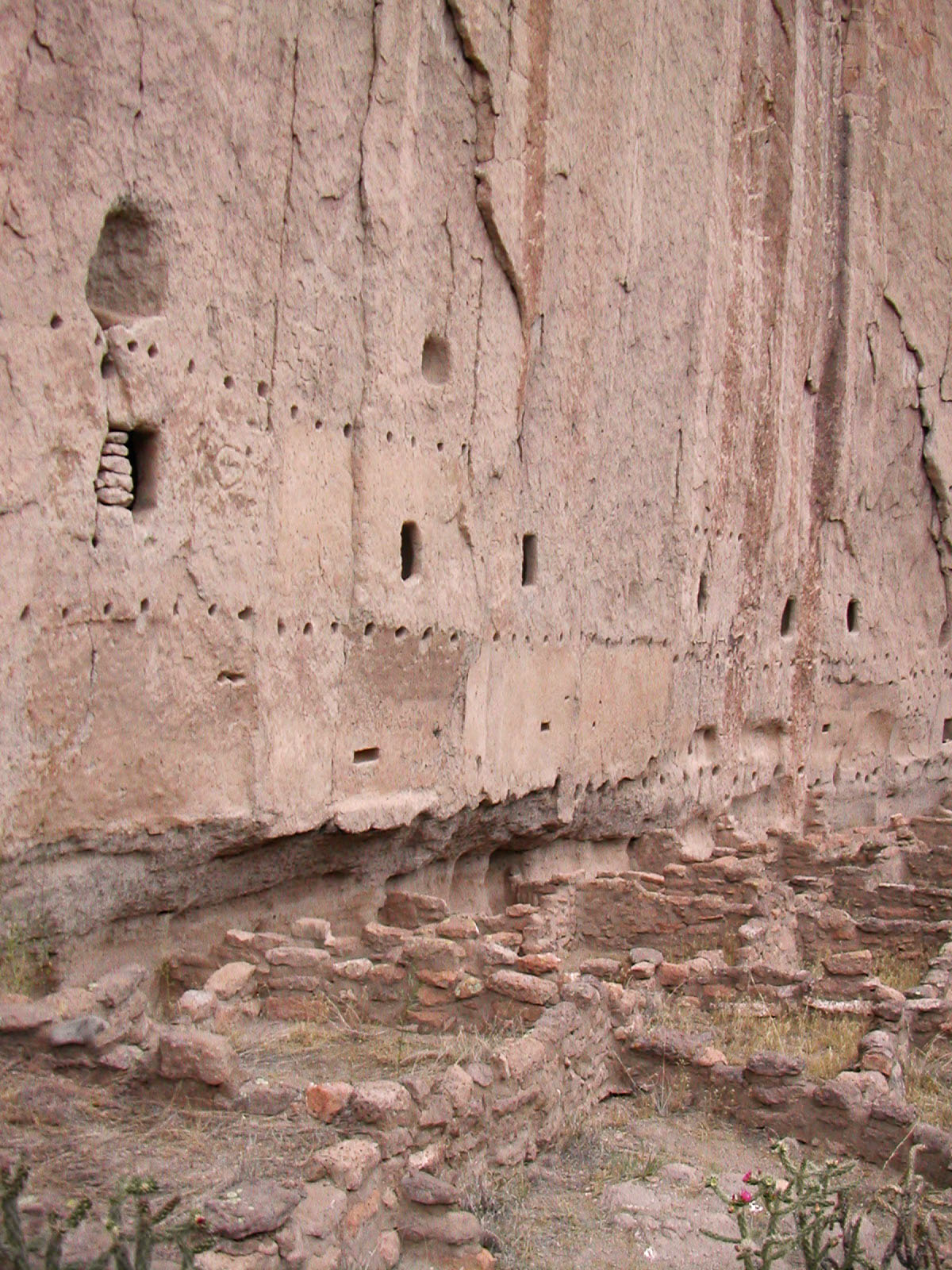
A cliff dwelling at Bandelier National Monument.

Most notable Pueblo structures were made of adobe and built like an apartment complex. Generally speaking, Pueblo buildings feature a box base, smaller box on top, and an even smaller one on top of that, with the tallest reaching four and five stories. There were floors for storage and defense, living and religious ceremonies. Generally, there were no doors on the bottom floor until recent times. This limited access to the buildings so movable ladders were key elements. One ladder would take inhabitants to the patio, or second floor, and another led through an opening through a roof and onto the first floor. Other ladders led to higher floors.

==== Architectural elements ====
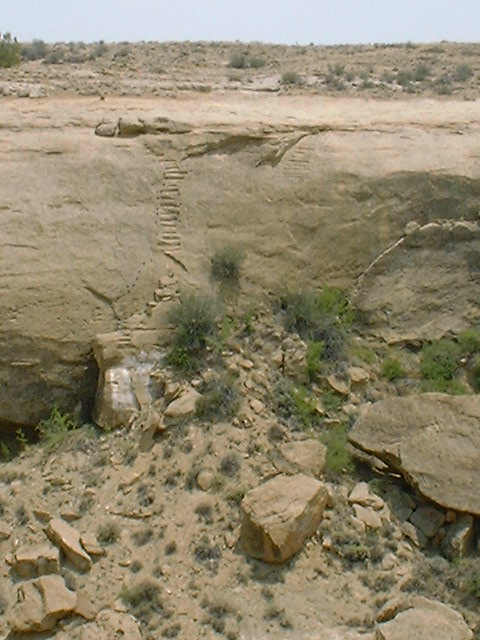
Stairs carved in a cliff face in Chaco Canyon.

The key technology of the Pueblo peoples was their irrigation techniques. These were used throughout their dwellings, and often determined the siting of communities.

Many pueblos feature T-shaped doors in adobe walls. Usually one meter wide, they are wider on top and narrower below. The Great house-style pueblos were constructed on a box system. Builders used molds to pour compacted mud without organic material. The exterior was stuccoed with sand, lime and oyster dust shells, then it was painted blue, green, or pink. Made without foundations, the walls were built from slots that were 25 centimeters deep. The doors were proportional to the size of the room. Stairs, ramps, and ladders were built to allow access to the buildings.

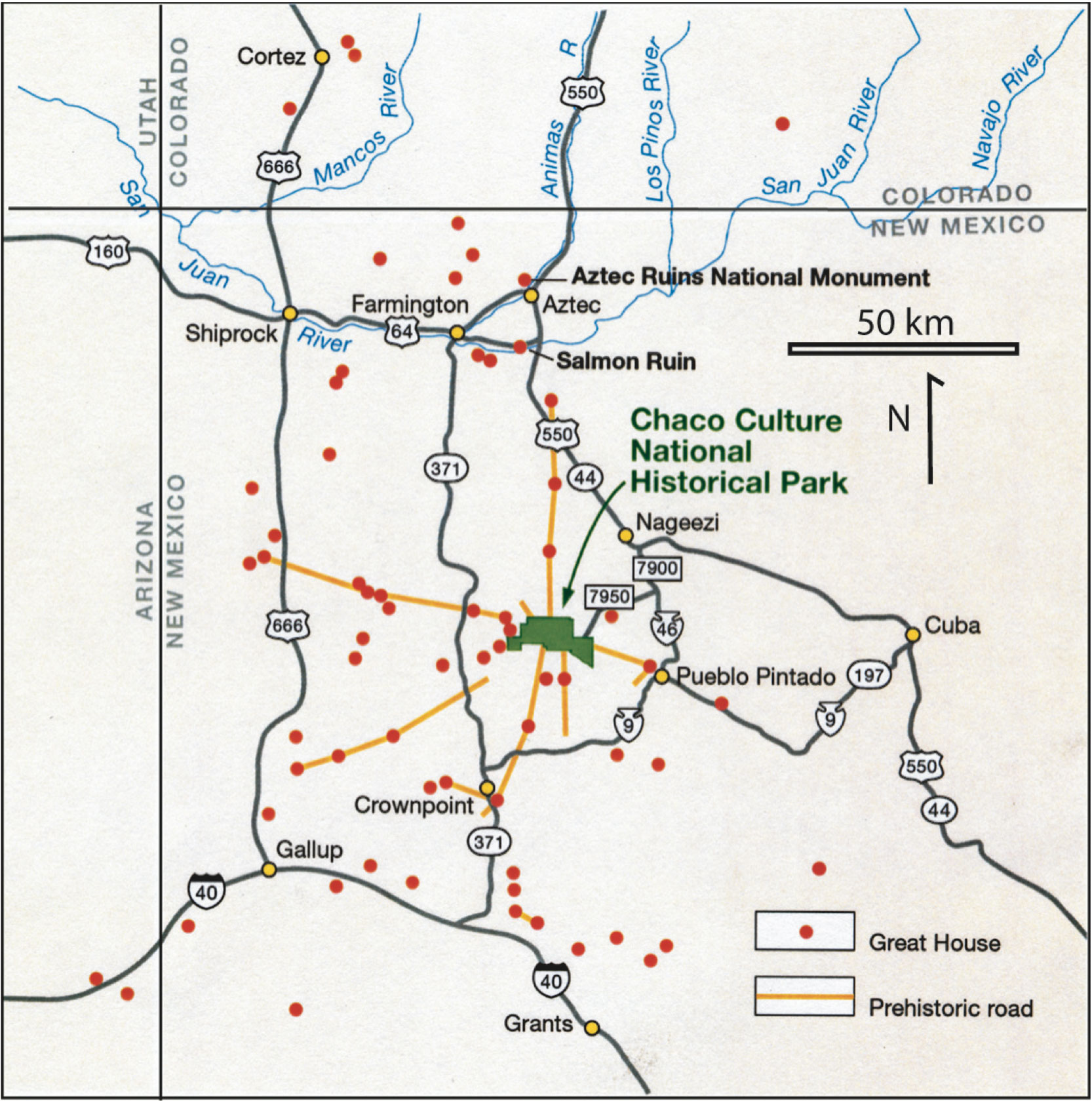
A roadmap of the Chaco Canyon culture roadways.

There are a number of consistent features surrounding the dwellings. They include water retention structures like the Mesa Verde Reservoirs, and stone towers. Each were about 60 meters long, 33 meters apart, and 2.5 meters high. In 2009 it was suggested that the shape of an oval bowl with curved sides and the uneven embankments on the long sides are unsuited for any kind of ball game; On the other hand, they appear to correspond with dance floors of the Tohono O'odham, used for Wi:gita ceremonies until at least the 1930s.

For a period of time, pueblos throughout the Southwest were connected by a network of roads that radiated from Chaco Canyon, which is believed to have been a cultural epicenter. Remnants of this roadway system are evident throughout New Mexico and Arizona today.

== Types of dwellings ==
In addition to the movable structures used by other Native Americans across North and South America, the Pueblo peoples created distinctive structures for living, worshiping, defense, storage, and daily life.

- Pueblo – Referring to both a certain style of Puebloan architecture and groups of people themselves, the term pueblo is used in architectural terms to describe multistory, apartment-like buildings made of adobe. In this article they are called "great houses".
- Great houses – Generally built on flat plains throughout the Southwest, the great house-style Pueblo dwelling sat independent of cliffs.
- Pit houses – Most of the populations of the Southwest lived in pit houses, carefully dug rectangular or circular depressions in the earth with wattle and daub adobe walls supported by log sized corner posts.
- Cliff dwellings – Constructed in the sides of the mesas and mountains of the Southwest, cliff dwellings comprised a large number of the defensive structures of the Pueblo people.
- Jacal is a traditional adobe house built by the ancestral Pueblo peoples. Slim close-set poles were tied together and filled out with mud, clay and grasses, or adobe bricks were used to make the walls.

== Lists of dwellings by state ==
=== Kansas ===
El Cuartelejo

=== Nevada ===
Pueblo	Pueblo peoples	Nearest town (modern name)	Location	Type	Description	Photo
Pueblo Grande de Nevada	Virgin Anasazi	Overton		Great house	Ruins. Listed on the National Register of Historic Places.	

=== Sonora ===
Site name	Pueblo peoples	Nearest town (modern name)	Location	Type	Description	Photo
Cerro de Trincheras	Hohokam			Trincheras	Ruins.	

=== Texas ===
Site name	Pueblo peoples	Nearest town (modern name)	Location	Type	Description	Photo
Firecracker	Mogollon	El Paso		Linear adjoined rooms	Ruins.	
Hot Well	Mogollon	El Paso		Cliff dwelling	Ruins.	
Ysleta Del Sur	Tiwa	El Paso		Great house	An active pueblo that is home of one of the 21 federally recognized Pueblos.	

=== Unknown locations ===
Site name	Pueblo peoples	Nearest town (modern name)	State	Location	Description	Photo
Pagmi						
Paguemi						
Sargarria						
Siemas						
Triati						
Urraca						
Xutis						
Yncaopi						
Ytriza						

== See also ==
- List of the oldest buildings in the United States
- Indian Mesa
- Navajo pueblitos
- Pueblo Revolt
- Spanish missions in New Mexico
- Tanoan languages
- Timeline of Chacoan history
- Trail of the Ancients National Scenic Byway, Four Corners, Colorado and Utah
- Trail of the Ancients Scenic Byway (New Mexico)
