= Yucca House National Monument =

Archaeological site in Colorado, United States

- IUCN category III (natural monument or feature)
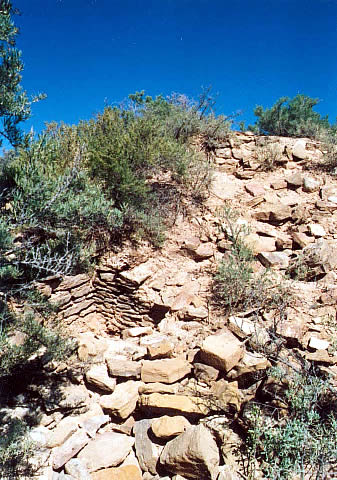
- Unexcavated mound at Yucca House National Monument

- Location within Colorado Location within the United States
- Interactive map of Yucca House National Monument
- Location: Montezuma County, Colorado, USA
- Nearest city: Cortez, Colorado
- Coordinates: 37.25028°N 108.68639°W
- Area: 195 acres (79 ha)
- Created: December 19, 1919
- Governing body: National Park Service
- Website: Yucca House National Monument

U.S. National Monument
- Designated: December 19, 1919

Yucca House National Monument is a United States National Monument located in Montezuma County, Colorado between the towns of Towaoc (headquarters of the Ute Mountain Ute Tribe) and Cortez, Colorado. Yucca House is a large, unexcavated Ancestral Puebloan archaeological site.

Yucca House was established as a national monument in 1919, by President Woodrow Wilson's Proclamation No. 1549.

== Geography ==
Yucca House National Monument is located in the Montezuma Valley at the foot of Sleeping Ute Mountain, called "mountain with much yucca growing on it" by the Ute people, and inspiration for the name of the national monument.

== History ==
The site is one of many Ancestral Pueblo (Anasazi) village sites located in the Montezuma Valley occupied between AD 1100 and 1300 by 13,000 people. A 2020 summary stated that the unexcavated "pueblo village has the ruins of 600 rooms, 100 kivas, several towers, multiple plazas, unexplained structures and one great kiva".

Two unexcavated settlement areas covered in vegetation include:

- Western Complex was a large pueblo of up to 600 rooms, 100 kivas and a giant, perhaps community, kiva. A spring runs through the complex. A large building about 80 × 100 feet, Upper House, was made of adobe. The ruins are about 12 to 15 feet high, but may have been twice that height.
- Lower House is an L-shaped pueblo 200 feet by 180 inches with a plaza, 8 small rooms 7 × 2 feet and a large kiva

Nearby were the ancient pueblo village of Mud Springs at the head of McElmo Canyon and Navajo Springs, was the original site of the Ute Mountain Indian Agency south of Sleeping Ute Mountain in the early 1900s.

Like other nearby Ancient Pueblo peoples, the Yucca House pueblo dwellers abandoned their homes, but because a major excavation has not been completed it is not known when, or if there is a relationship between these people and those of nearby pueblo settlements. The pueblo was abandoned between 1240 and 1280 CE, making it one of the last inhabited pueblos in the Mesa Verde region.

Several lines of evidence, including linguistic terminology and oral history, suggest that the ancestors of the Tewa were the inhabitants of Yucca House.

== Archaeological study and mapping ==
The site was first described by W. H. Jackson in 1874; he had been a member of the Hayden Geological Survey of 1871. Since that time, the following archaeological studies have been conducted:

- William Henry Holmes visited in 1875 and in 1878 produced a report for the United States Geological Survey. Holmes erroneously named the land "Aztec Springs" believing that ruins were the home of a band of Aztecs. He created the initial map of the ruins.

Holmes reports: "These ruins form the most imposing pile of masonry yet found in Colorado. The whole group covers an area of about 480,00 square feet, and has an average depth of from 3 to 4 feet. [...] The stone used is chiefly of the fossiliferous limestone that outcrops along the base of the Mesa Verde a mile or so away."

- In 1918 J. Walter Fewkes studied and remapped the ruins
- An excavation was completed by the Museum of Natural History in New York in the late 1910s led by Earl Morris and, in the 5th year of excavation led by Dr. Clark Wissler. Wissler found that the interior walls of the "remarkable shrine room" were painted white with a red border and the floor covered with expertly cut slabs of stone, similar to one of the rooms at the Mesa Verde National Park. A sacred 2½ foot serpent was carved into wood at the ceiling.
- In two separate projects in 1964, Al Lancaster studied the area and stabilized the masonry wall of Lower House and Al Schroeder found that some of "Upper House" was constructed of adobe, quite rare for sites built in the 13th century
- Studies were conducted in the late 1990s and into 2000 following the donation of additional acreage which expanded the number of sites. The Yucca House Mapping Project was a venture by the Crow Canyon Archaeological Center and Mesa Verde National Park. The group produced a detailed map of the site and analysed some pottery found above ground.

== National monument ==
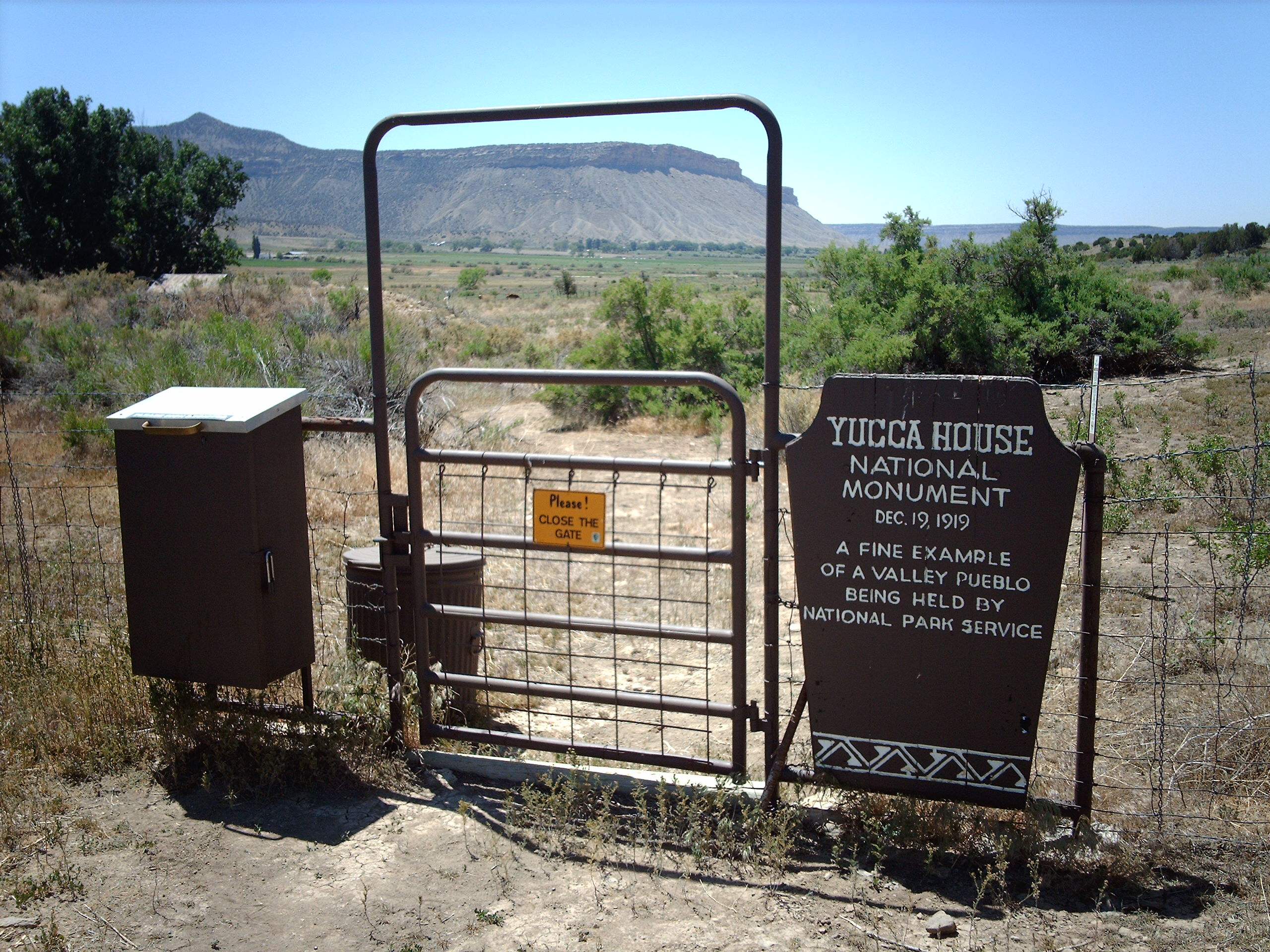
Entrance to Yucca House National Monument

President Woodrow Wilson proclaimed the site a National Monument on December 19, 1919, by Proclamation No. 1549, on a 9.5 acre (38,000 m2) piece of land previously donated by Henry Van Kleeck, originally known as Aztec Springs; the name of the site was changed by the Proclamation. The size of the monument was increased to 33 acres in 1996 with land donated by Hallie Ismay. Since 1990, the monument has been managed by park service staff at Mesa Verde National Park. Hallie Ismay was an unofficial steward of the Yucca House site for 62 years.

As of 1919, the site was one of many research national monuments designated during that era to preserve the ruins, plants and animals in the Yucca House area.

As a National Park Service historic area, the park was administratively listed on the National Register of Historic Places on October 15, 1966.

After completion of the mapping project in 2000, the authors of the report provided this conclusion:

Although we now have a better sense of layout and spatial relationships among the architectural features at Yucca House, we still know relatively little about the length of the Yucca House occupation, the role of public architecture in the village, and the extent of social interaction and other relationships with nearby large villages.

Currently, there are no true interpretive features, facilities or fees at Yucca House. See the Visitor Guide for directions to the remote location. Parking space is limited and roads may be difficult immediately following rains or snowmelt.

A 2017 report stated that fewer than 1,000 people visited the monument annually. A visitor in 2018 provided this summary of the experience at Yucca House after arriving without a guide:

You can make out small parts of a wall here and there and see piles of stones, but the vegetation covers the majority of the ruins and it is difficult to understand what you are seeing. A few interpretive signs would be helpful.

=== Additional expansion plan ===
The owners of a property abutting the National Monument, Bernard and Nancy Karwick, offered to donate 160 acres of land that would significantly expand the 33 acres of the monument. The 2015 offer was tentatively accepted but required Congressional approval. By March 2020, the plan had been passed by the House and would move to the Senate. The bill sponsored by U.S. Rep. Scott Tipton was signed by President Trump in 2021 and the expansion is expected to be carried out.

After completion of environmental assessments, in July 2024, the National Park Service accepted a deed to the Karwick property as the final step of the acquisition.

== Controversy ==
Entrance to the monument is by an easement across the Box Bar ranch owned by the local Ford dealer Joe Keesee and his partner Lucky Pickens since 2005. Though the ranch was purchased with the easement—County Road 20.5, although it is not marked as such—already in place, there have been numerous attempts to prevent the public from accessing the monument via the easement. These efforts have been documented in the local newspaper, the Cortez Journal, and have included an attempt to convince the county Board of Commissioners to abandon the public road that feeds the easement, erection of "no trespassing signs" and gates and removal of directional signs.

While these complicate the access to the monument, the NPS has published two sets of directions from the intersection of Hwy. 160 and Hwy. 491. One set of directions provides specifics about opening and closing of the gate that visitors may encounter.

After the planned expansion is approved by Congress and signed into law, the additional land should resolve the controversy, with a new method of entry into the monument as well as a new parking lot and perhaps, restrooms. Senators Cory Gardner and Michael Bennet co-sponsored the bill in the Senate. Such construction would not occur soon because "a wetlands study and an assessment of the archaeological treasures underlying that land" must first be completed. Cliff Spencer, Superintendent of Mesa Verde National Park, and Alan Loy, also of Mesa Verde National Park, both have worked relentlessly to clear obstacles to expanding and improving the National Monument.

== Birding and wildlife ==
Canada goose, mallard, Eurasian collared dove, killdeer, white-tailed kite, northern harrier, red-tailed hawk, northern flicker, American kestrel, black-billed magpie, common raven, European starling, western bluebird, mountain bluebird, American robin, house sparrow, house finch, white-crowned sparrow, Savannah sparrow, song sparrow, Lincoln's sparrow, western meadowlark and red-winged blackbird have been observed on the Karwick expansion property.

== See also ==
- List of national monuments of the United States

Mesa Verde - administrator of Yucca House National Monument

- Mesa Verde National Park
- Ute Mountain Tribal Park

Other neighboring Ancient Pueblo sites in Colorado

- Anasazi Heritage Center
- Canyons of the Ancients National Monument
- Crow Canyon Archaeological Center
- Hovenweep National Monument

Other cultures in the Four Corners region

- Trail of the Ancients
- List of ancient dwellings of Pueblo peoples

Early American cultures

- List of prehistoric sites in Colorado
- Ancestral Puebloans
- Oasisamerica cultures
- Paleo-Indians
