= Joe Ben Wheat Site Complex =

- Joe Ben Wheat Site Complex (Site ID 5MT16722: 5MT1, 5MT2, 5MT3)
- U.S. National Register of Historic Places
- Nearest city: Yellow Jacket, Colorado
- Architectural style: Prehistoric ruins
- NRHP reference No.: 03001383
- Added to NRHP: 2004

Joe Ben Wheat Site Complex is a set of archaeological sites dated from AD 600 to 1300 that are located near Yellow Jacket in Montezuma County, Colorado. The complex is also known by its collective site ID of 5MT16722. In 2004, the Joe Ben Wheat Site Complex was added to the National Register of Historic Places.

== Discovery ==
A farmer named Mr. Stevenson found a piece of pottery at the site of a house that had burned down near the town of Yellow Jacket, Colorado. In 1953 he sent the pottery to Joe Ben Wheat, Curator of the University of Colorado Museum of Natural History. Wheat recognized that the pottery was probably dated AD 500-750 and accepted an offer from Stevenson to investigate the property in the Mesa Verde region of southwestern Colorado.

== Excavation ==
Wheat performed eight excavations at the three sites that make up the Joe Ben Wheat Site Complex.

=== Stevenson Site (5MT1) ===
Stevenson Site (Site ID 5MT1) is a small Basketmaker III Era village (AD 675–700) of 4 semi-subterranean dwellings, arranged in two semi-circular arcs, with 28 pit-rooms that were used for work rooms and storage. In the center of the arcs were plazas. A large open-air ramada is also located at the site.

Also known as the "Stevenson Site" after the farmer who had found the pottery, Wheat changed the original name to a methodical name using the Smithsonian nomenclature, 5MT1, which consists of: 1) the number "5" for the state of Colorado, 2) the two letter abbreviation of "MT" for Montezuma County, and 3) a sequentially assigned site number, "1" for the first excavation.

=== 5MT2 ===
Site ID 5MT2 consists of 3 or 4 dwelling groupings from Pueblo II Era through Pueblo III Era (AD 1060-1280).

=== Site 5MT3 ===
Site 5MT3. The largest of the three sites excavated, it is multi-component pueblo with occupation components dating between AD 600 and 1300. The site consists of four pit-house structures with associated storage rooms. The site was abandoned for three centuries then became occupied again.

Wheat's work at Yellow Jacket spanned over 30 years (1954–1991). These three sites, 5MT1-3, had unusual and interesting features never been seen before and were a great discovery of the Mesa Verde region.
