= Cohonina =

Ancient Native American tribe in Arizona

Regions with significant populations
- United States ( Arizona)

Related ethnic groups
- Yuman, Havasupai, Walapai

The Cohonina peoples inhabited the north-western area of Arizona, to the west of the Grand Canyon in the United States. First identified in 1937 by Lyndon Hargrave, surveying pottery for the Museum of Northern Arizona, they are named for the Hopi term for the Yuman, Havasupai, and Walapai peoples who inhabited the area and are thought to be descended from the Cohonina. They in turn have lent their name to Coconino County, Arizona. They are thought to have lived between 500 and 1200, evolving alongside the Ancestral Puebloans (Anasazi) and enjoying a period of fertility, producing "significant" amounts of pottery, before worsening weather conditions – arid soils and rain erosion – forced them from their homelands. Several lines of evidence led to a theory that a climate change episode caused a severe drought in the region from 1276 to 1299, forcing these agriculture-dependent cultures to move on. Archaeological evidence of the Cohonina disappears beyond this period.

== Archaeological evidence ==
The majority of the archaeological evidence that does exist consists of agricultural remnants and pottery. Pueblo I Era period pottery, often decorated, has been found alongside evidence of maize cultivation. These pieces are largely constructed using "paddle-and-anvil" methods, with black and grey illustrations, and are found west of the San Francisco Peaks, east of Aubrey Cliffs, and south of the Grand Canyon.

The area was largely pine forest, and the Cohonina may have utilised wild plants are the mainstay of their agriculture. They also used obsidian to construct arrowheads and for trade.

== Construction ==
According to research by the Anthropology Department at the Northern Arizona University, the Cohonina underwent three distinct periods of construction. Between 700–900, their homes consisted of "deep timber-lined pit houses with rooftop entry and ventilator shafts." Often these structures differed in material depending on the season. Between 900 and 1100, large walls of stone surrounded Cohonina forts, and masonry has been found in housing dated from this period.

Between 1100 and 1250, residences utilised masonry and San Francisco Mountain Gray Ware stone, though production of this stopped after 1275.

== See also ==
- Keyhole Sink
