= Yellow Jacket Pueblo =

Ancestral Puebloan archeological site

Yellow Jacket Pueblo is an Ancestral Puebloan archeological site located near Cortez, Colorado, in the Four Corners region of the Southwestern United States. With 1,200 rooms and 200 kivas spread across 100 acres (40 ha), it is the largest ancient pueblo in the Mesa Verde region.
