= Durango Rock Shelters Archeology Site =

Archaeological site in Colorado, United States

- U.S. National Register of Historic Places
- Location within Colorado Location within the United States
- Nearest city: Durango
- Coordinates: 37°20′32″N 107°52′02″W
- NRHP reference No.: 85000260
- Added to NRHP: 1985

Durango Rock Shelters Archeology Site is also known as the Fall Creek Rock Shelters Site. An Ancient Pueblo People (Ancestral Puebloans, also known as the Anasazi) archaeological site, it is located in Durango in La Plata County, Colorado. People from the Late Basketmaker II and Basketmaker III Eras inhabited the site between AD 1 and 1000.

The site is also known as "5LP4134".

== Discovery ==
Earl H. Morris conducted an excavation of this open talus site in Animas Valley in 1938–1939. It was the first site where dwellings had been found of the early Basketmakers with actual house structures, one of which he describes as follows:

A site for the dwelling was secured by digging a drift into the steep hillside and piling the excavated earth and stone out in front until a terrace large enough to accommodate the projected house had been provided. The floor area was scooped out to shallow saucer shape—in this case 9 m. in diameter—and coated with mud. At the margins, the mud curved upward to end against the half-buried foot logs which were the basal course of the wall. The walls were composed of horizontal wood and mud masonry. They rose with an inward slant to a little better than head height, then were cribbed for a distance to reduce the diameter of the flat portion of the roof, which was of clay supported by parallel poles, The arc of stones was a retaining device placed to hold back the ever-growing accumulation of refuse that was dumped at the brink of the terrace.

== See also ==
- Indigenous peoples' sites in Colorado
