= Mano (stone) =

Hand-held stone tool used with a metate or quern to process or grind food by hand

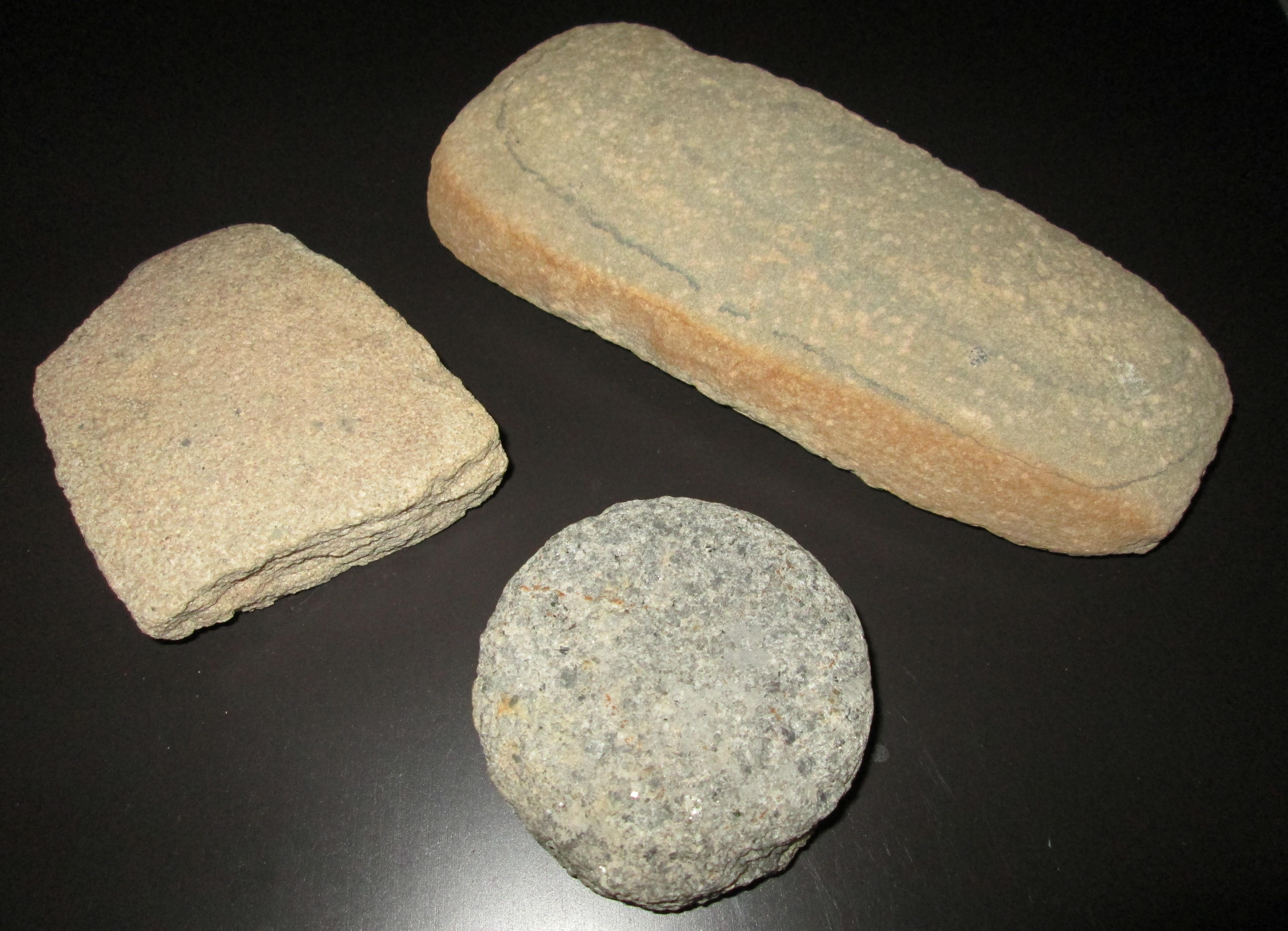
Native American manos from Arizona.

A mano (Spanish for 'hand') is a ground stone tool used with a metate to process or grind food by hand. It is also known as metlapil, a term derived from Nahuatl.

== History ==
Manos were used in prehistoric times to process wild seeds, nuts, and other food, generally used with greater frequency in the Archaic period, when people became more reliant upon local wild plant food for their diet. Later, manos and metates were used to process cultivated maize.

In its early use in the American Southwest, the mano and metate were used to grind wild plants. The mano began as a one-handed tool. Once the maize cultivation became more prevalent, the mano became a larger, two-handed tool that more efficiently ground food against an evolved basin or trough metate.

Besides food, manos and metates were used to separate and pulverize clay from earthen debris and stones. The resulting clay was used for pottery-making.

== Grinding process ==
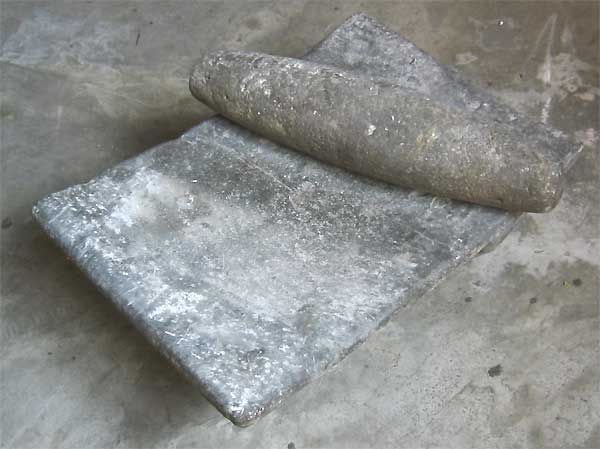
Metate, and mano.

A mano, a smooth hand-held stone, is used against a metate, typically a large stone with a depression or bowl. The movement of the mano against the metate consists of a circular, rocking or chopping grinding motion using one or both hands.

Ancient Pueblo People often set up work rooms, called mealing rooms, that were established with sets of manos and metates for mass grinding efforts.

== See also ==
- Bedrock metate
- Grinding slab
- Quern-stone
