= Las Humanas =

Pueblo ruins in New Mexico

Gran Quivira
- Las Humanas
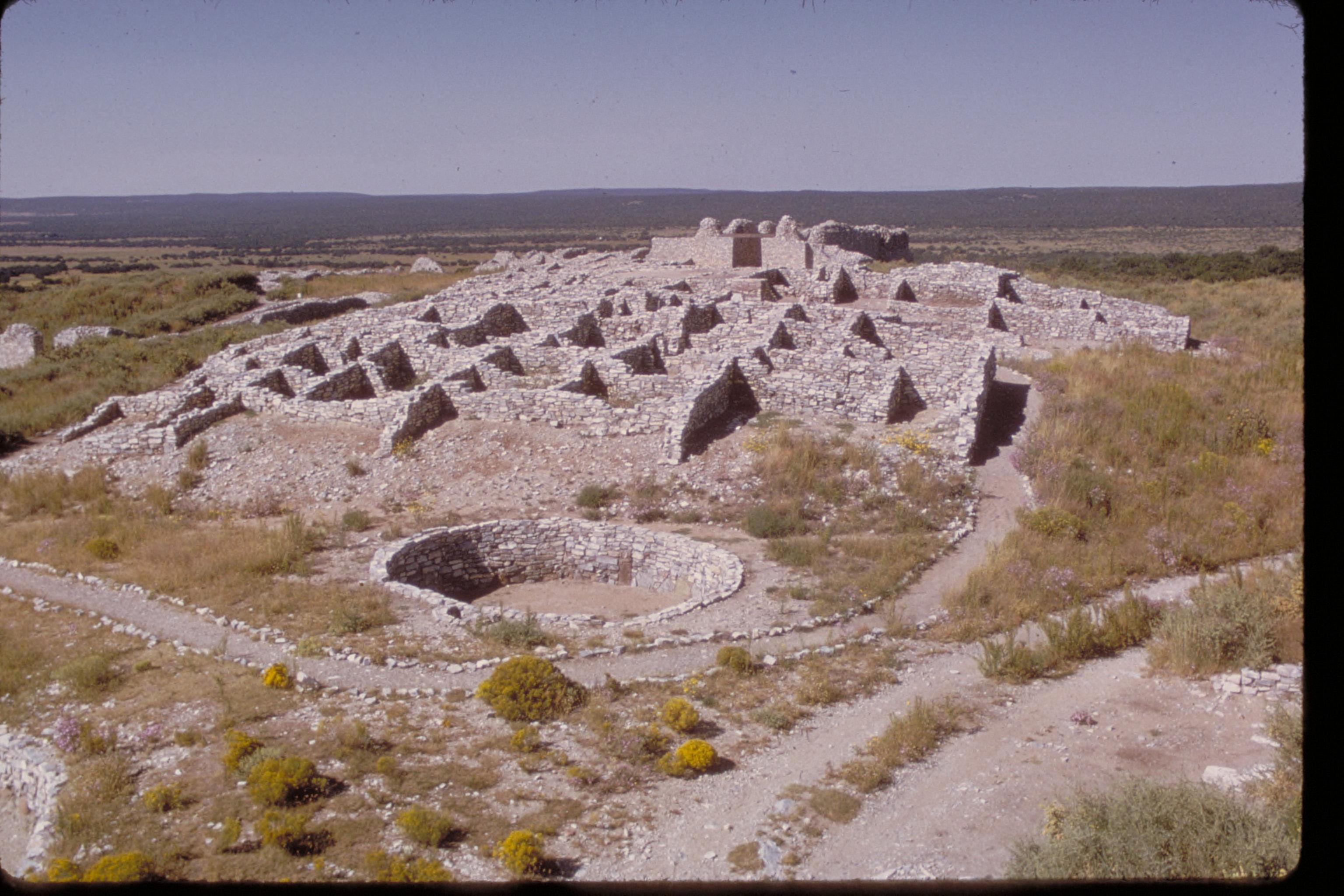
- Aerial view of main Gran Quivira ruins.

- Location within New Mexico
- 34°15′35″N 106°5′25″W
- Type: settlement
- Cultures: Pueblo I (750–900), Pueblo II (900–1150), Pueblo III (1150–1350), Pueblo IV (1350–1600), Pueblo V (1600- )
- Location: Socorro County
- Part of: Jumanos Pueblos

History
- Abandoned: ~1672

Site notes
- Material: limestone with caliche morter
- Elevation: 2,140 m (7,020 ft)
- Architectural style: Pueblo
- Owner: National Park Service
- Management: National Park Service
- Public access: Limited

Gran Quivira, also known as Las Humanas, was one of the Jumanos Pueblos of the Tompiro Indians in the mountainous area of central New Mexico. It was a center of the salt trade prior to the Spanish incursion into the region and traded heavily to the south with the Jumanos of the area of modern Presidio, Texas and other central Rio Grande areas. Its ruins are now part of Salinas Pueblo Missions National Monument.

== History ==
Beginning around A.D. 800 a sedentary native population settled here building pithouses. Archeological evidence indicates that by A.D. 1300, the area overlooking the southern Estancia Basin was inhabited by Tompiro-speaking peoples who built with the culturally distinct pueblo masonry architecture. From about A.D. 1000 to the 1600s, Gran Quivira, along with the other Jumanos Pueblos to the east and the other Salinas Pueblos to the north (Tenabó, Abó, Quarai, Tajique and Chilili) was a major trade center between the Great Plains, the Pacific Coast, and the Great Basin.

In 1598, while exploring the territory he had claimed for Spain, Don Juan de Oñate arrived at Las Humanas and administered an oath of obedience and vassalage to the Humano Indians. Years later missionary activities at Gran Quivira began in earnest and around 1626 the pueblo was designated as a visita of San Grégorio de Abó mission. By 1629 Gran Quivira had its own resident priest, Fray Francisco de Letrado, who began construction of the first permanent mission at Gran Quivira. Letrado was removed in 1631 and Fray Francisco de Acevado took control and completed construction of Inglesia de San Isidro in 1635. In 1659 Fray Diego de Santander was permanently assigned to Gran Quivira after which construction on a new larger church, San Buenaventura, began. The churches were built out of the same blue-gray local limestone as the earlier pueblo and were held together with caliche-based mortar.

At the time the Spanish came in the 1580s Las Humanas had a population of about 3,000. The area suffered from Spanish expropriation of resources and then from droughts in the 1660s. 450 residents died from starvation in 1668. In September 1670 an Apache raid damaged the mission and pueblo, left eleven dead, and took thirty inhabitants as captives. By the early 1670s the pueblo was abandoned.

The first detailed description in English is Major James Henry Carleton's twenty-page pamphlet Diary of an excursion to the ruins of Abó, Qarra, and Gran Quivira, in New Mexico published in 1855. In 1909 the ruins were incorporated into the Gran Quivira National Monument, which was enlarged in 1980–1981 to include Abó and Quarai, and which was renamed in 1988 to Salinas Pueblo Missions National Monument.

The site was listed on the National Register of Historic Places on October 15, 1966, and the Gran Quivera Historic District was listed on the National Register of Historic Places in July 2015.

== Sources ==
- Anderson, Gary Clayton. The Indian Southwest, 1580–1830: Ethnogenesis and Reinvention. Norman: University of Oklahoma Press, 1999.
