= Pueblo V period =

Ancestral puebloan period 1600 to present

The Pueblo V period (AD 1600 to present) is the final period of Ancestral Puebloan culture in Oasisamerica and includes contemporary Pueblo peoples. From the previous Pueblo IV period, all 19 of the Rio Grande valley pueblos remain in the contemporary period. The only remaining pueblo in Texas is Ysleta del Sur Pueblo, and the only remaining pueblos in Arizona are maintained by the Hopi. The rest of the Pueblo IV pueblos were abandoned by the nineteenth century.

The Pueblo V period (Pecos Classification) is similar to the "Regressive Pueblo period."

== History ==
Considerable change occurred during the Pueblo V period due to Spanish colonization of the Americas beginning in the 16th century and the United States westward expansion of the 19th and 20th centuries. These influences resulted in:

- Population decline due to European diseases
- Efforts to secure traditional Pueblo lands by the Europeans and other Native American tribes
- Establishment of Indian reservations

The Crow Canyon Archaeological Center notes, "Today, Pueblo people live in the modern world while maintaining their distinct culture and rich traditional heritage."

== Cultural groups and periods ==
The cultural groups of this period include:

- Ancestral Puebloans – southern Utah, southern Colorado, northern Arizona and northern and central New Mexico.
- Hohokam – southern Arizona.
- Mogollon – southeastern Arizona, southern New Mexico and northern Mexico.
- Patayan – western Arizona, California, and Baja California.

== Notable abandoned sites ==
The people from the following sites abandoned their pueblos and generally blended into Puebloans societies in the Rio Grande valley of New Mexico:

- Bailey Ruin – Arizona
- Bandelier – New Mexico
- Casa Grande – Arizona
- Mesa Grande – Arizona
- Pueblo Grande – Arizona
- Pecos – New Mexico, abandoned in the 19th century
- Puye Cliff Dwellings – New Mexico

Map of Ancient Pueblo People in the American Southwest and Mexico.

During the Pueblo IV period, Four Corners pueblo settlements were abandoned (northern and central portion of the Anasazi region.)

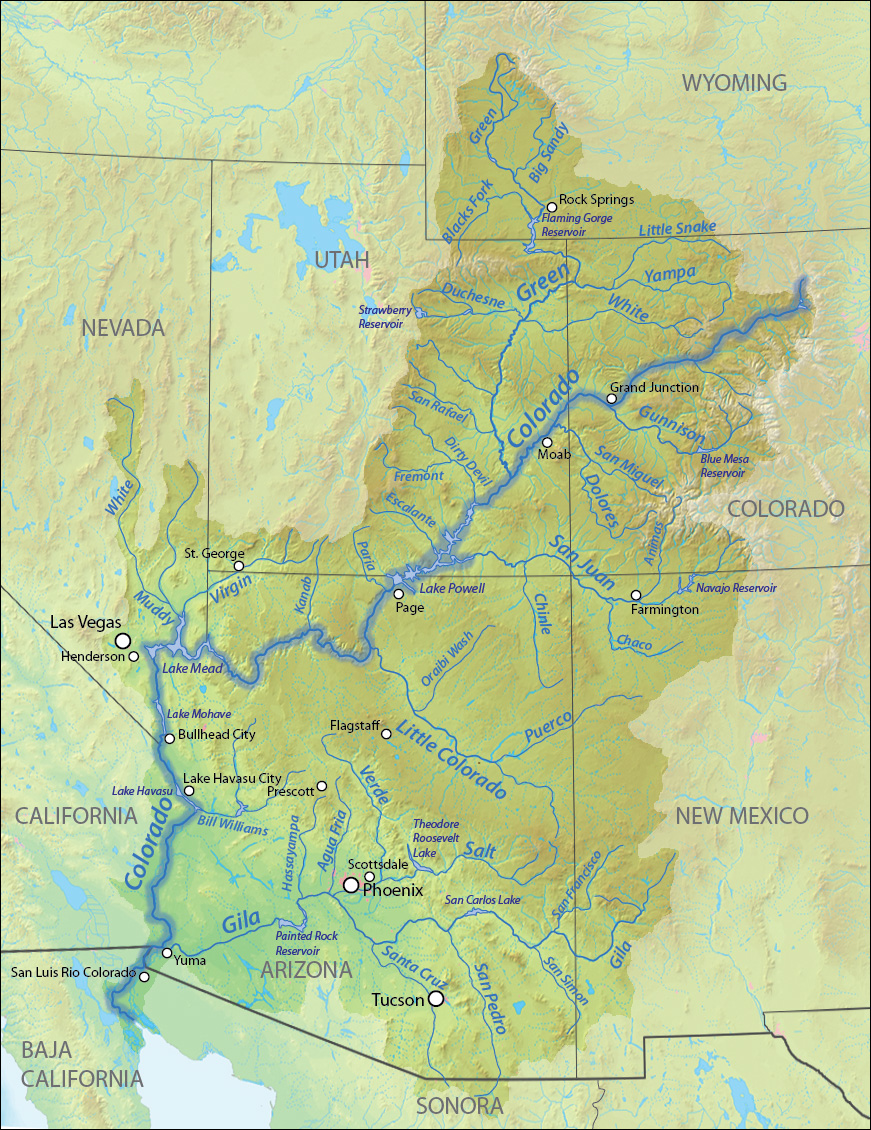
Colorado River tributaries

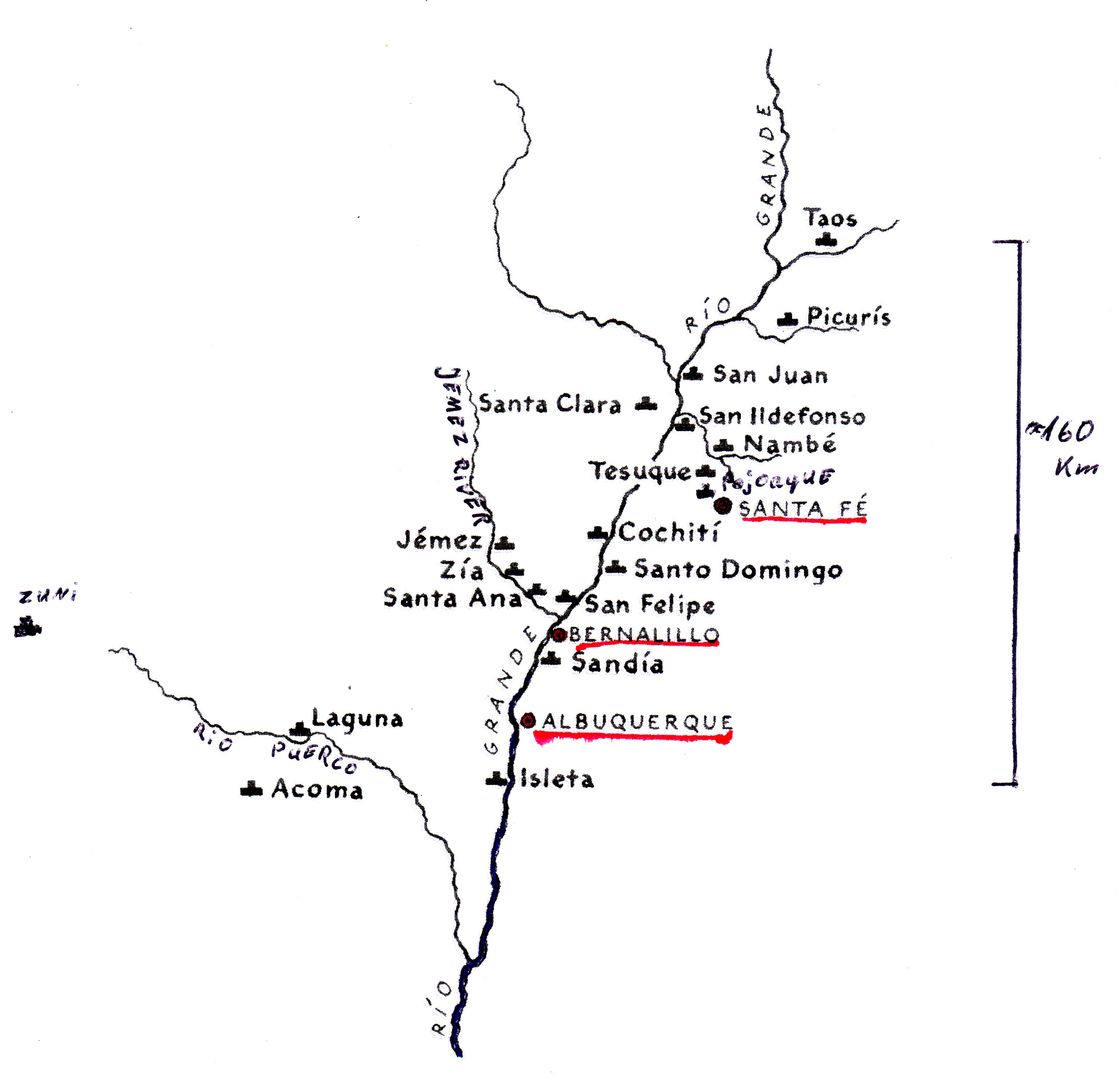
Pueblos in the Rio Grande valley

== Federally recognized Pueblos ==
There are 21 federally recognized Pueblos that are home to Pueblo people. (Note: The two pueblos not identified in the Rio Grande valley map of the Pueblo IV Era are the Hopi Tribe of Arizona and the Ysleta del Sur Pueblo of Texas)

| Arizona | New Mexico | Texas |
|---|---|---|
| Hopi Tribe: Awatovi Ruins; Oraibi | Acoma Pueblo; Cochiti Pueblo; Isleta Pueblo; Jemez Pueblo; Kewa Pueblo (Santa Domingo Pueblo); Laguna Pueblo; Nambé Pueblo; Ohkay Owingeh Pueblo (San Juan Pueblo); Picuris Pueblo; Pojoaque Pueblo; San Felipe Pueblo; San Ildefonso Pueblo; Sandia Pueblo; Santa Ana Pueblo; Santa Clara Pueblo; Tesuque Pueblo; Taos Pueblo; Zia Pueblo; Zuni Pueblo | Ysleta del Sur Pueblo |

== Gallery ==
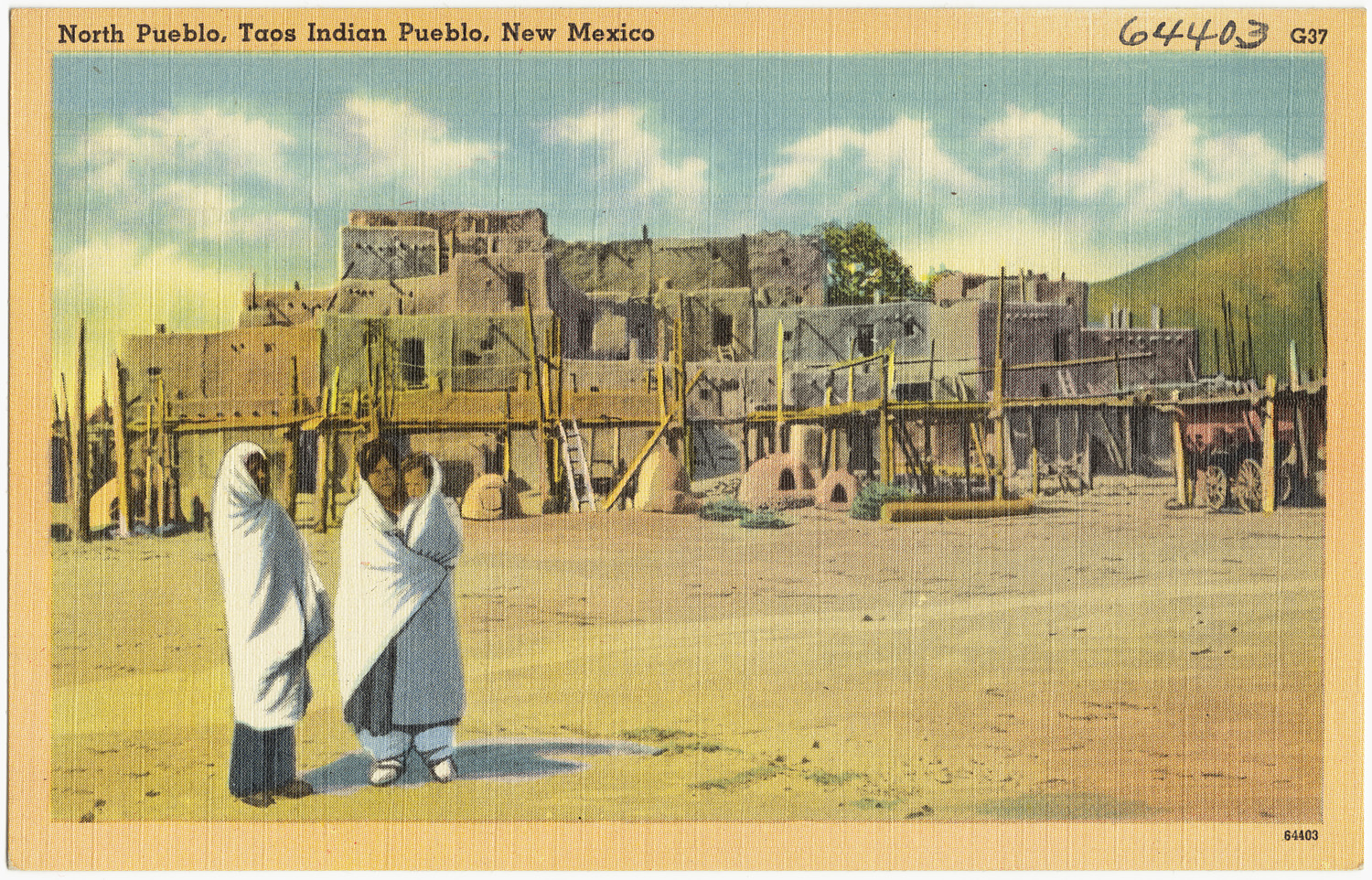
North Pueblo, Taos Pueblo

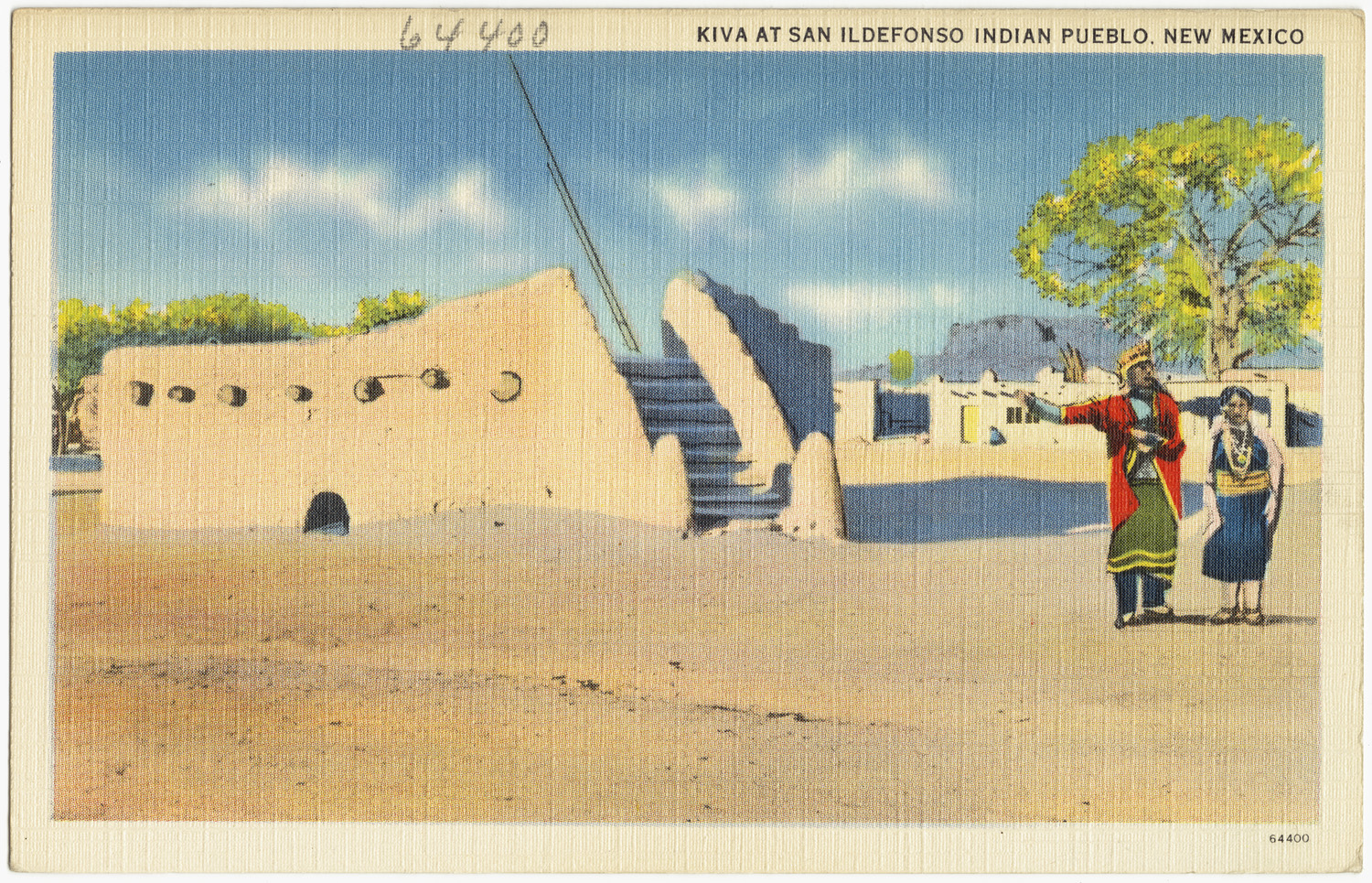
Kiva at San Ildefonso Pueblo

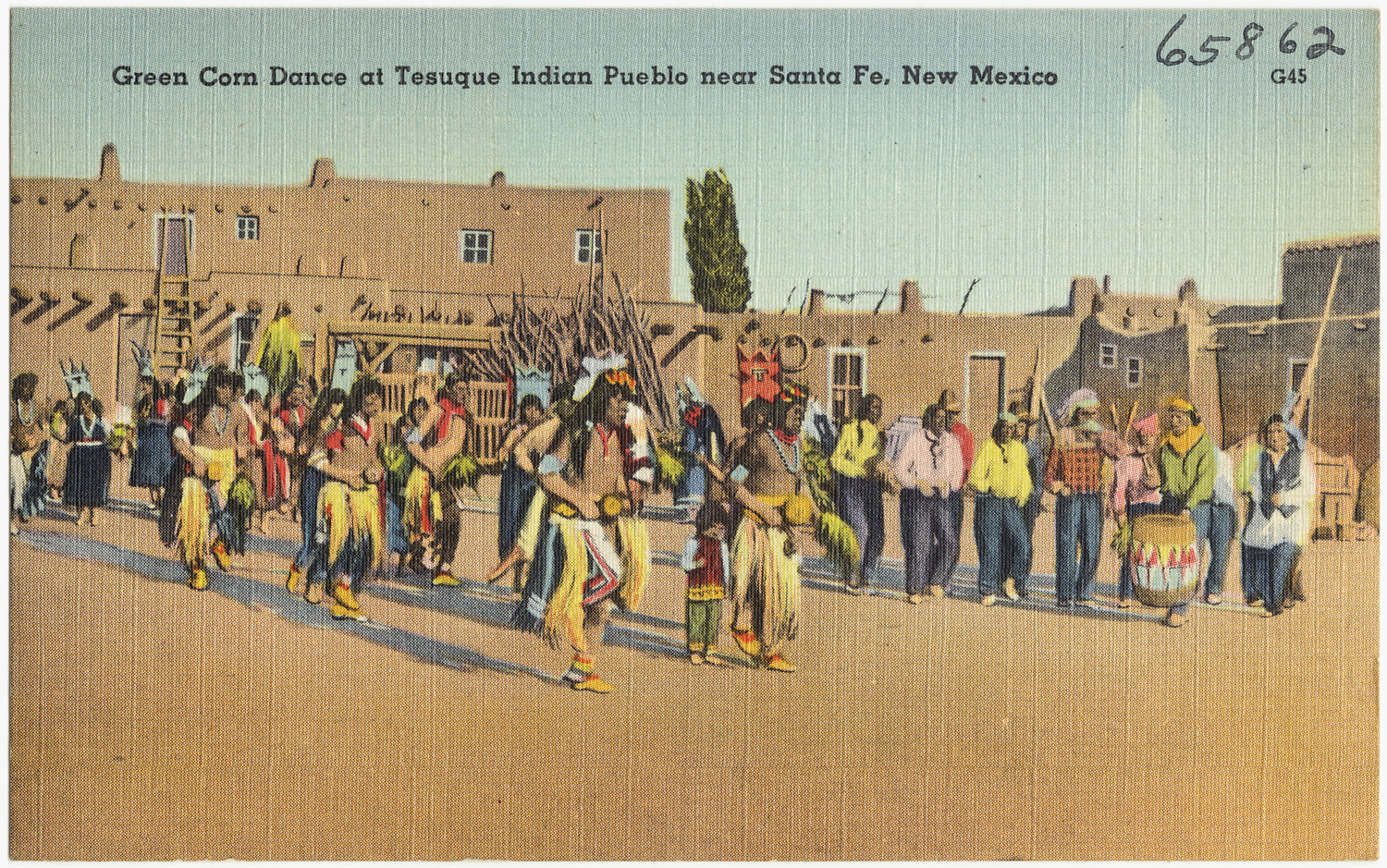
Green Corn Dance at Tesuque Pueblo

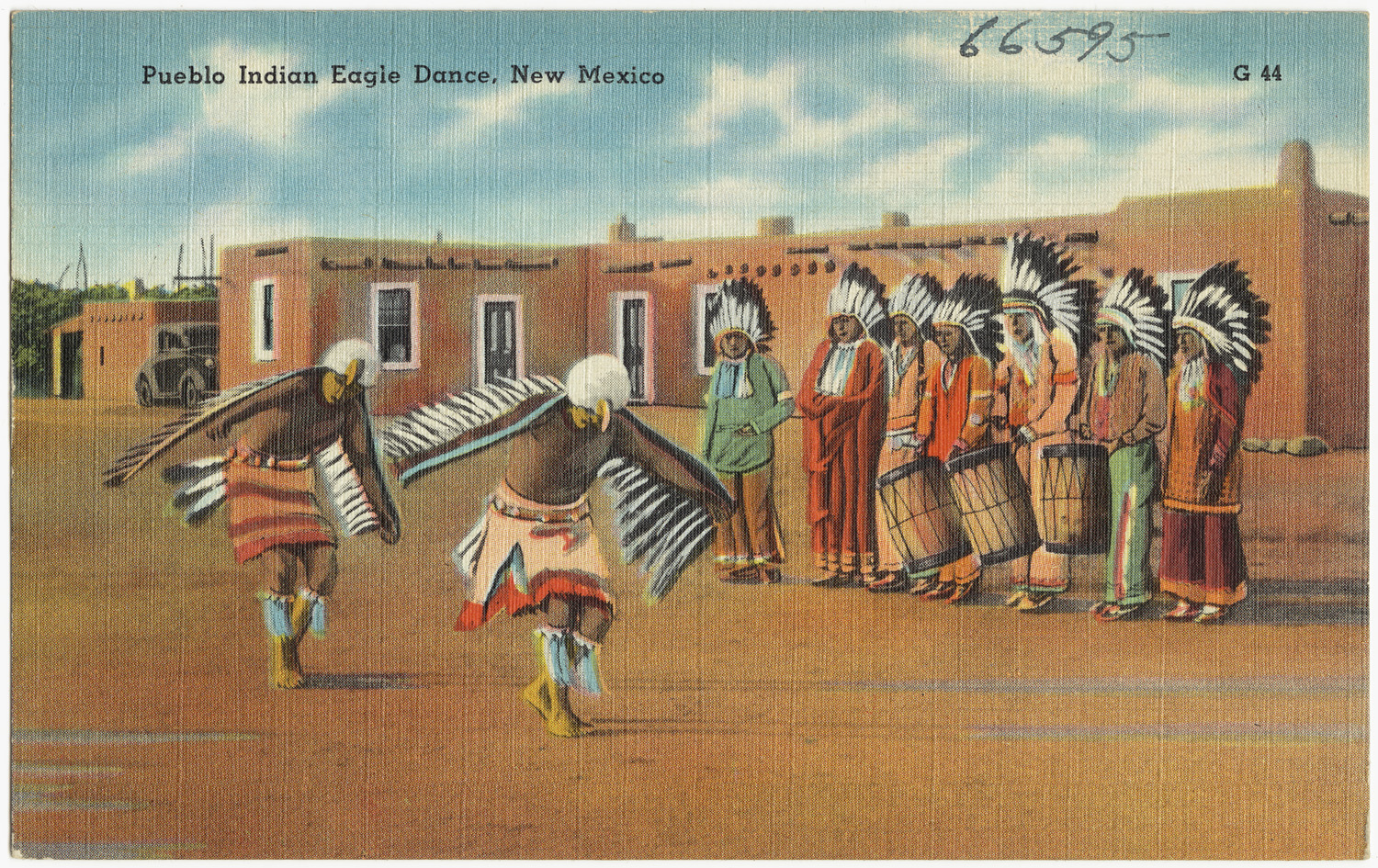
Pueblo Eagle Dance

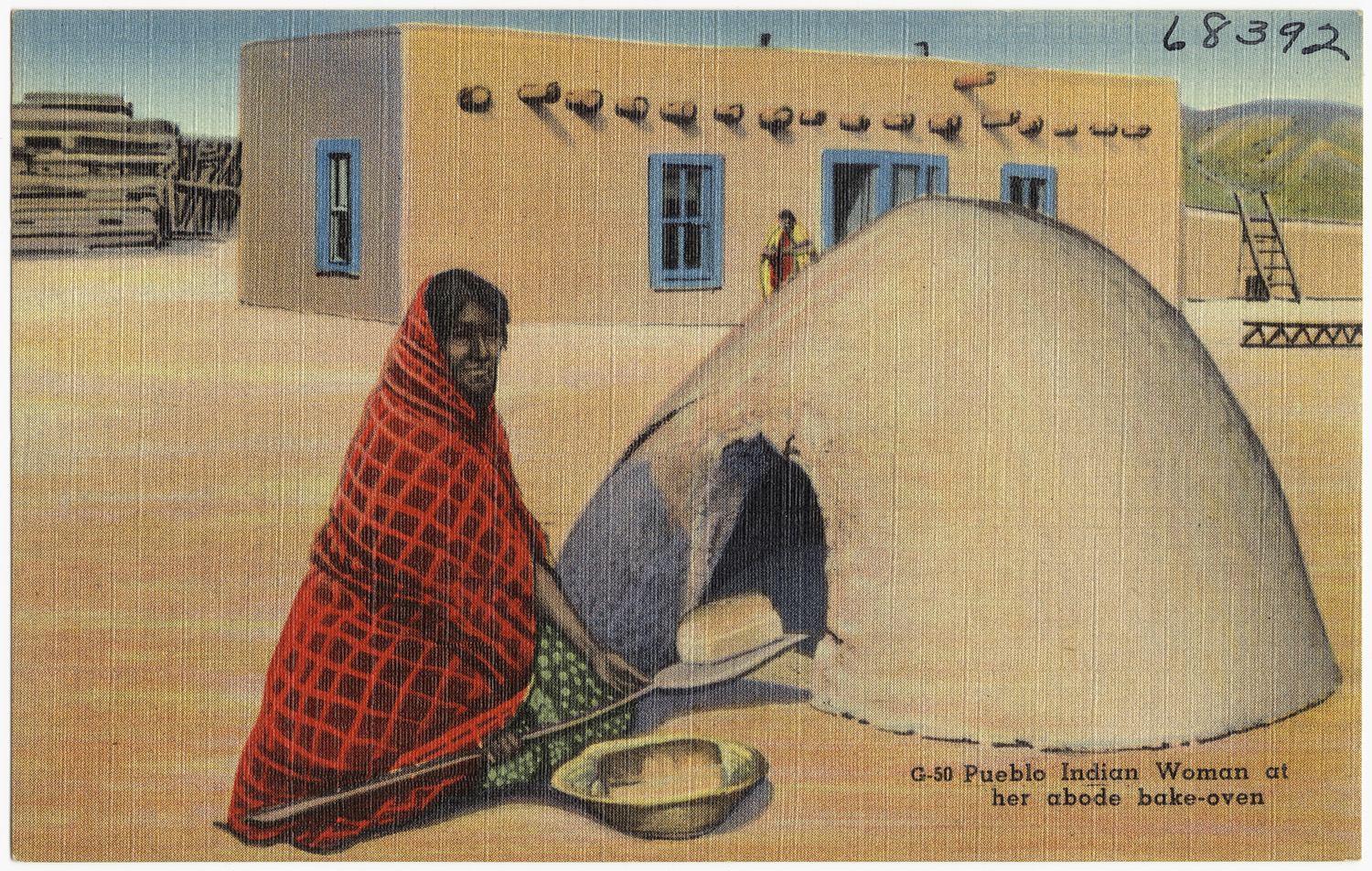
Puebloan woman at her adobe bake-oven

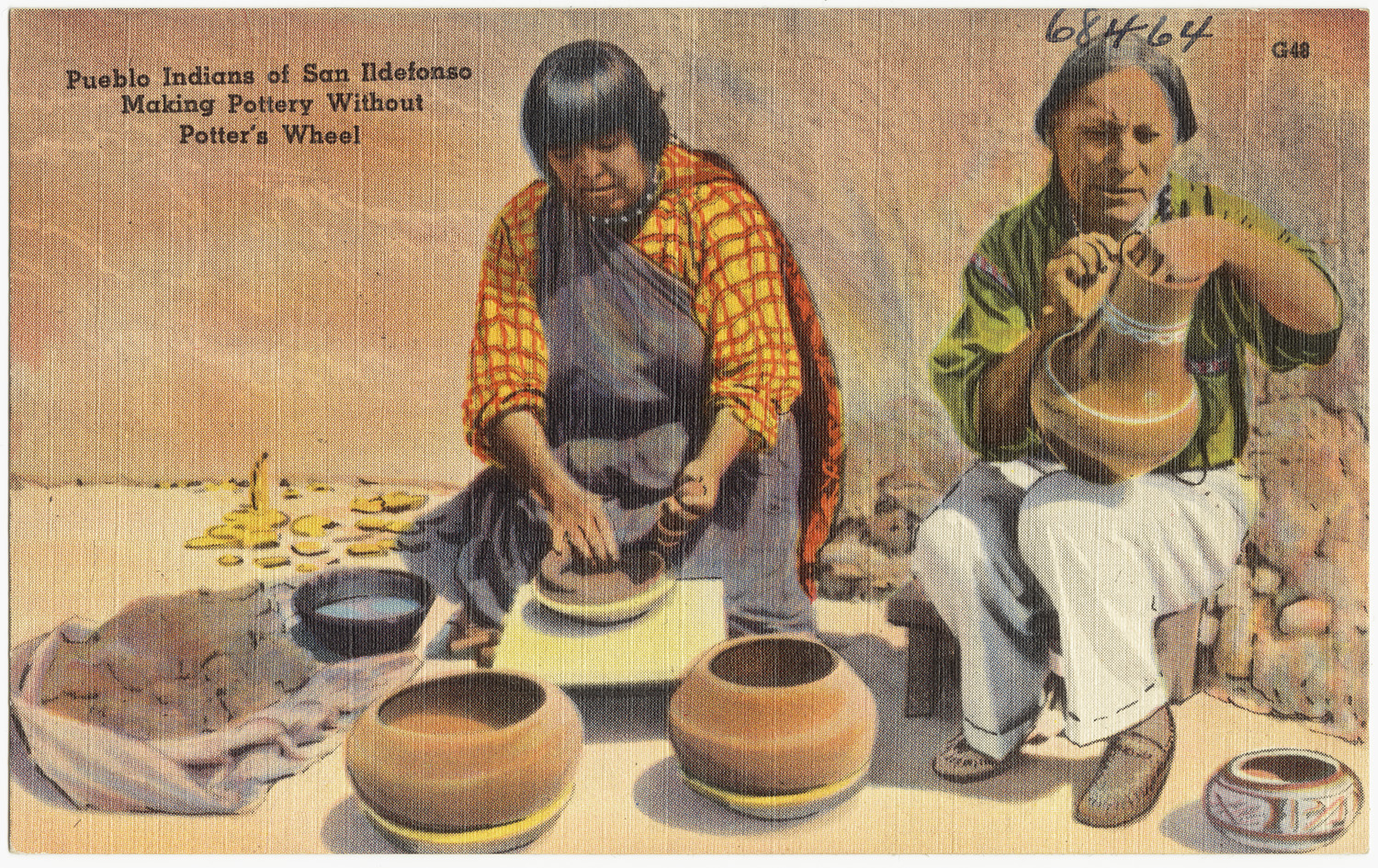
Puebloans of San Ildefonso making pottery

== See also ==
- American Indian Wars in the Southwest
- Pueblo – modern and ancient pueblos
- Pueblo Revolt of 1680
- Puebloan peoples
