= Pecos Classification =

Chronological division system

The Pecos Classification is a chronological division of all known Ancestral Puebloans into periods based on changes in architecture, art, pottery, and cultural remains. The original classification dates back to consensus reached at a 1927 archæological conference held in Pecos, New Mexico, which was organized by the United States archaeologist Alfred V. Kidder.

== Original classification ==
The original Pecos Classification contained eight stages of Southwestern prehistory, but it did not specify dates.

1. Basketmaker I, or Early Basketmaker II
2. Basketmaker II, or Late Basketmaker II
3. Basketmaker III, or Post-Basketmaker
4. Pueblo I, or Proto-Pueblo
5. Pueblo II
6. Pueblo III, or Great Pueblo
7. Pueblo IV, or Proto-Historic
8. Pueblo V, or Historic

== Current classification ==
Although the original classification has been significantly debated and sometimes modified over the years, the split into Basketmaker and Pueblo periods still serves as a basis for discussing the culture of the Ancestral Puebloans of the Four Corners area. The following classification is based in part of the Revised Pecos Classification for the Mesa Verde region.

=== Archaic–Early Basketmaker (8000–1500 BCE) ===
The pre-Ancestral Pueblo culture that moved into the modern-day Southwestern United States after the big game hunters departed are called Archaic. Little evidence for extensive habitation before 8000 BC exists. From evidence near Navajo Mountain, they were nomadic people, hunter-gatherers traveling in small bands. They gathered wild foods when in season, and hunted with stone-tipped spears, atlatls, and darts. Game included rabbits, deer, antelope, and bighorn sheep.

The original classification postulated a Basketmaker I period which was subsequently discredited due to lack of physical evidence. It was combined with the Archaic period.

This period was called Oshara tradition. There was a trend toward a sedentary lifestyle, with small-scale cultivation of plants beginning 1000 BC.

=== Early Basketmaker II (1500 BCE – 50 CE) ===
The early Ancestral Pueblo camped in the open or lived in caves seasonally. During this period, they began to cultivate gardens of maize (flint corn in particular) and squash, but no beans. They used manos and metates to grind corn, and the women made baskets for numerous uses.

=== Late Basketmaker II (50–500) ===
The people constructed primitive storage bins, cists, and shallow pit-houses. At this stage, evidence suggests that the beginning of a religious and decision-making structure had already developed. Shamanistic cults existed, and petroglyphs and other rock art indicate a ceremonial structure as well. Groups appear to be increasingly linked into larger-scale decision-making bodies.

=== Basketmaker III (500–750) ===
Deep pithouses were developed, along with some above-ground rooms. The bow and arrow replace the atlatl and spear. Plain bisque and some painted black-on-white pottery is made. Cultivation begins of beans, available due to trade from Central America, and edible due to slow cooking in pottery vessels. Wild amaranth and pinyon pine were also staples. People of this period may have domesticated turkeys.

The prototype kivas were large, round, and subterranean.

=== Pueblo I period (750–900) ===
The Pueblo I period saw increasing populations, growing village size, social integration, and more complicated and complex agricultural systems typified this period. The construction and year-round occupation of pueblos begins; the people constructed reservoirs and canals to deal with scarce and irregular water resources. Large villages and great kivas appear, though pithouses still remain in use. Above-ground construction is of jacal or crude masonry. Plain gray bisque predominates in pottery, though some red bisque and pottery decorated in black and white appears.

=== Pueblo II (900–1150) ===
By AD 1050, Chaco Canyon (in present-day New Mexico) was a major regional center, with a population of 1,500–5,000 people. It is surrounded by standardized planned towns, or great houses, built from the wood of more than 200,000 trees. Thirty-foot-wide (9.1 m) roads, flanked by berms, radiate from Chaco in various directions. Small blocks of above-ground masonry rooms and a kiva make up a typical pueblo. Great kivas were up to 50–70 feet (15–21 m) in diameter. Pottery consists of corrugated gray bisque and decorated black-on-white in addition to some decorated red and orange vessels. The people imported shells and turquoise from other cultures through trading.

During the 12th century, populations began to grow after a decline at the end of the Pueblo II period. More intense agriculture was characteristic, with terracing and irrigation common.

=== Pueblo III (1150–1350) ===
Settlements consist of large pueblos, cliff dwellings, towers and turkey pens. Most villages in the Four Corners area are abandoned by AD 1300. The distinction between the Hohokam and Ancient Pueblo people becomes blurred.

=== Pueblo IV (1350–1600) ===
Typically, large pueblos are centered around a plaza. Socially, this was a period of more conflict than cooperation, which is thought to have led to abandonment of settlements at Mesa Verde. The people began making kachinas for religious and ritual purposes. Plain pottery supplants corrugated. Red, orange and yellow pottery is on the rise as the black-on-white declines. Cotton is introduced and grown as a commodity.

The Puebloans are joined by other cultures. As early as the 15th century, the Navajo were in the process of migrating into the region from the north. In the next century, the Spanish colonists first came in the 1540s from the south.

=== Pueblo V (1600–present) ===
The Spanish dominate and take over sites such as the Acoma Pueblo. Their arrival sends Pueblo subcultures underground.

== Puebloan sites ==
- Mesa Verde National Park
- Canyons of the Ancients National Monument
- Bandelier National Monument
- Chaco Canyon in Chaco Culture National Historical Park
- Canyon de Chelly National Monument
- Gila Cliff Dwellings National Monument
- Keet Seel in Navajo National Monument
- Chimney Rock National Monument

== See also ==
- List of dwellings of Pueblo peoples
- Hohokam
- Hopi
- Tiwa
- Zuni people
- John Wesley Powell
- Richard Wetherill
- Antiquities Act
