= Jumanos Pueblos =

The Jumanos Pueblos were several villages of the Tompiro Indians in the mountainous area of central New Mexico between Chupadera Mesa and the Gallinas Mountains including Pueblo Colorado, Pueblo Blanco (Tabirá), and the smaller Pueblo de la Mesa (LA 2091). Usually the group includes the addition of Gran Quivira and Pueblo Pardo. They were separated from the rest of the larger Salinas Pueblo group (Tenabó, Abó, Quarai, Tajique and Chilili) which lie north of Chupadera Mesa. The Jumanos Pueblos were a center of the salt trade prior to the Spanish incursion into the region and traded heavily with the Jumanos to the south in the area of modern Presidio, Texas and other central Rio Grande areas. They may have also traded with Jumanos along the Pecos River and other places to the east and maybe even north.

The pueblo inhabitants crafted colorful, high quality ceramics, which they used and traded. They subsisted primarily on agricultural crops (corn, beans, and squash), but also hunted game and collected wild plants.

At the time the Spanish came in the 1580s the pueblos had a population of estimated above 6,000. Subsequently, the area suffered from introduced European diseases, expropriation of resources by the Spanish and then from droughts in the 1660s, as well as attacks by the Apache. The dates these pueblos were abandoned has not been fully established, but it occurred between the 1670s the 1750s.

Today these villages consist of large masonry room block groups whose walls are mostly delineated by rows of cobbles with kivas shown in some cases by depressions and associated middens or trash dumps, shown by surface pottery shards. Notably in Grand Quivira there are still some standing walls.

== Sources ==
- Anderson, Gary Clayton. The Indian Southwest, 1580–1830: Ethnogenesis and Reinvention. Norman: University of Oklahoma Press, 1999.
