= Pueblo III period =

Era in the history of the Pueblo peoples

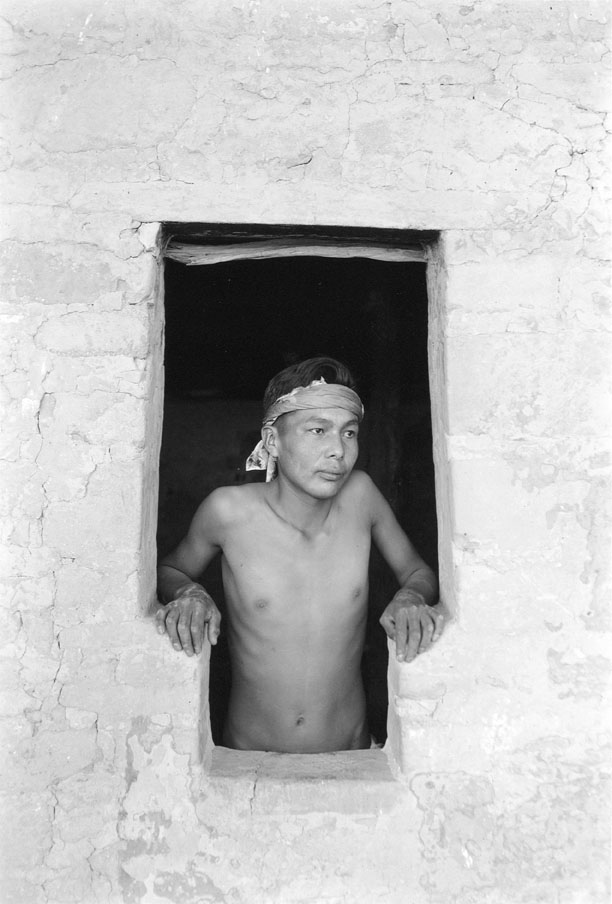
Navajo boy at T-shaped door

The Pueblo III period (AD 1150–1350) was the third period, also called the "Great Pueblo period" when Ancestral Puebloans lived in large cliff-dwelling, multi-storied pueblo, or cliff-side talus house communities. By the end of the period, the ancient people of the Four Corners region migrated south into larger, centralized pueblos in central and southern Arizona and New Mexico.

The Pueblo III period (Pecos Classification) is roughly the same as the "Great Pueblo period" and "Classic Pueblo period" (AD 1100–1300). It is preceded by the Pueblo II period, and is followed by the Pueblo IV period.

== Architecture ==
During the Pueblo III period most people lived in communities with large multi-storied dwellings. Some moved into community centers at pueblos canyon heads, such as Sand Canyon and Goodman Point pueblos in the Montezuma Valley; others moved into cliff dwellings on canyon shelves such as Mesa Verde or Keet Seel in the Navajo National Monument. Typical villages had included kivas, towers, and dwellings made with triple-coursed (three rows of stones) stone masonry walls. T-shaped windows and doors emerged for both surface and cliff dwellings.

- Cliff dwellings were built in shallow caves and under rock overhangs along canyon walls. In Mesa Verde, the structures within the alcoves were mostly made of sandstone blocks and adobe mortar. At Bandelier, the dwellings were carved directly into the soft ashy rock formations that make up the cliff faces of the finger mesas (the Bandelier Tuff). To build the dwellings, materials had to be brought to the alcove, such as fill dirt to level the cave floor, stones and mortar. Masonry craftsmanship became refined by this period. Stones were shaped and made smooth by pecking away at the surface, leaving a distinctive "dimpled" surface on the stone. The dwellings had sharp square corners. Walls were built to be thick enough to support multiple stories. Floors were made of wood, bark and mud. The most desired caves were those that faced south or southwest to reap the warmth of the winter sun. Doorways were small, covered with stone slabs for warmth. Exterior doorways were rarely built on the first floor. Ventilation holes in the ceilings held ladders for entry into the rooms. Plazas in front of the dwellings were used by women to grind corn, make baskets and clothing and prepare food. Men made their tools and children played there.
- Surface masonry buildings. Not all of the people in the region lived in cliff dwellings; many colonized the canyon rims and slopes in multi-family structures that grew to unprecedented size as the population swelled.
- Talus houses were built at the bottom of a cliff, often in front of "cavates" (cave rooms), and were about 5 feet, 8 inches high and 6 by 9 feet in surface area. The rooms were prepared by scooping soft tuff out of the cavity. Cavates is a term classified by archaeologist Edgar Lee Hewett.
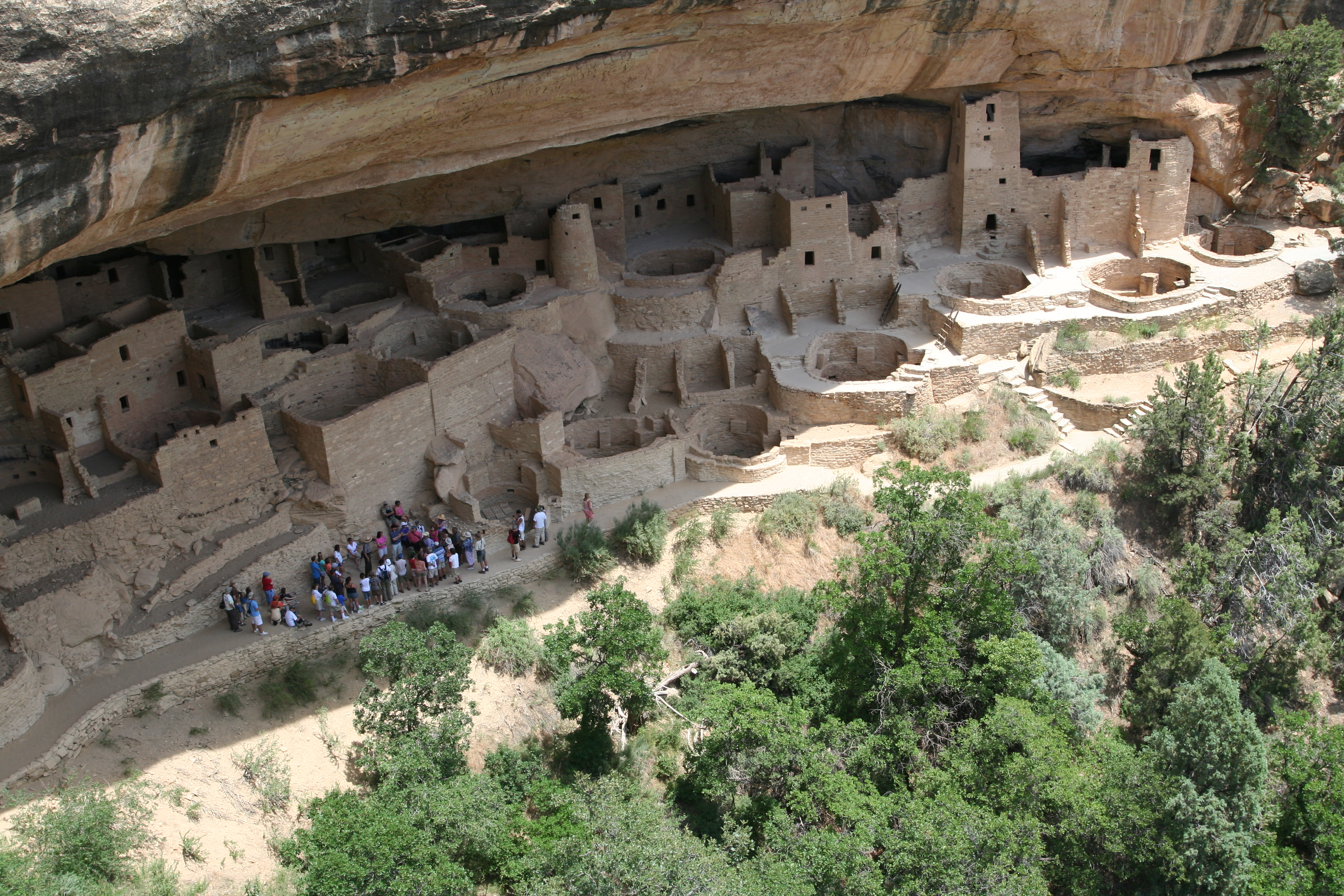
Cliff Palace at Mesa Verde National Park

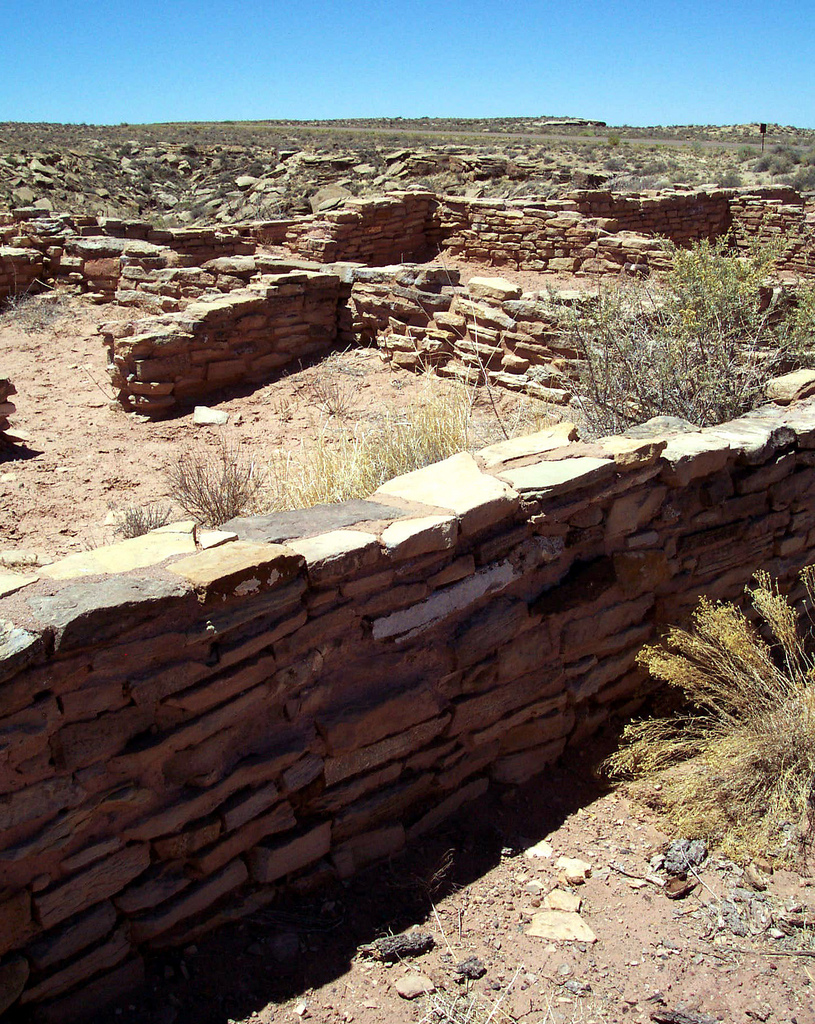
Puerco Pueblo walls of up to 125 rooms at the Petrified Forest National Park

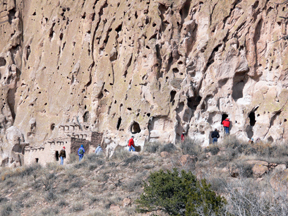
Bandelier National Monument Talus House

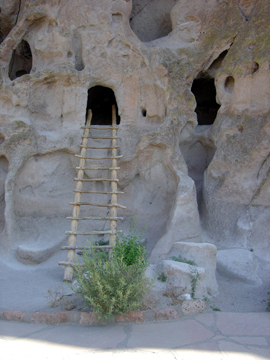
Bandelier National Monument cavates

== Communities ==
Map of Ancient Pueblo People in the American Southwest and Mexico.

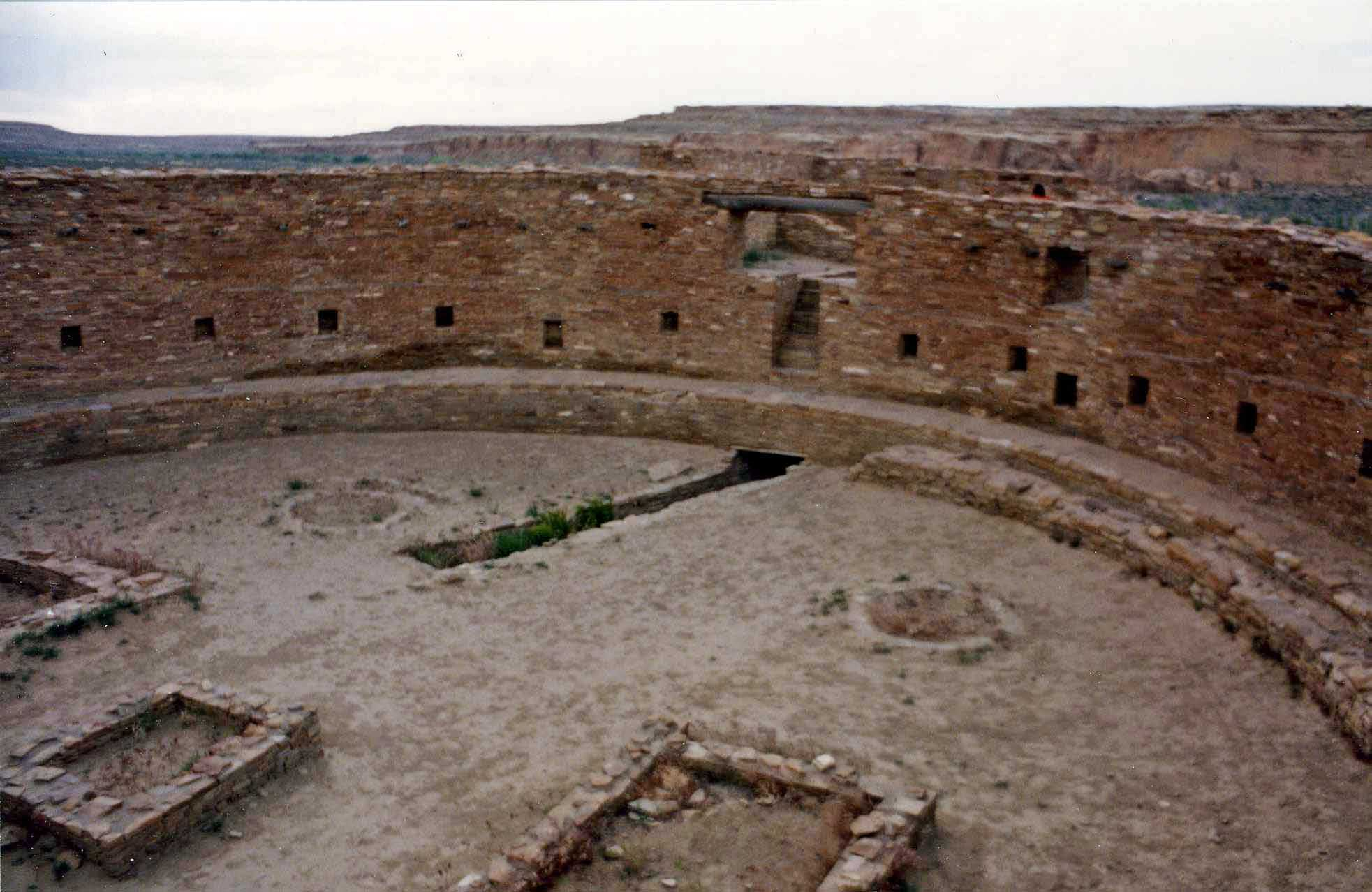
Great kiva at Chaco Culture National Historical Park

Three major regional centers with cliff dwellings and community centers were Chaco Culture National Historical Park in New Mexico, Mesa Verde National Park in southwestern Colorado and Betatakin and Keet Seel area (Navajo National Monument) in Arizona.

- Bandelier cliff alcoves and caves contained soft volcanic tuff which was scooped out to enlarge the area for masonry dwellings. Logs of juniper and pinyon trees were used to create frames for willow sticks, grass, bark and earth for ceilings and upper floors.
- Mesa Verde. Mug House, a typical cliff dwelling of the period, was home to around 100 people who shared 94 small rooms and eight kivas. Builders maximized space by abutting the pueblo rooms. Population peaked about AD 1200 to AD 1250 to more than 20,000 in the Mesa Verde Region in Colorado.
- Cowboy Wash, an archaeological site located on the southern slopes of Sleeping Ute Mountain, was inhabited during the Pueblo III period by people from the Chuska Mountains area of Arizona and New Mexico. They moved north and settled in the Montezuma Valley after the collapse of the Chaco culture, which had suffered due to a great drought from AD 1130–1180. From excavation of Cowboy Wash, four sites were found to be the scene of a violent attack between AD 1125–1150 and subsequent abandonment. The condition of the remains suggest that there may have been cannibalism. This would have been an extremely rare phenomenon in Ancient Pueblo People's history. Since it is such a rare occurrence, it is difficult to postulate the reasons for the violence. The attacks could have resulted from starvation during a period of drought or because Chuskans were seen as outsiders to the area.

== Culture and religion ==
The ancient people were short in stature: men were an average of about 5 feet and 4 inches tall and women were a few inches shorter. Women often died between the ages of 20 and 25. Men generally lived to 31 or 35 years old. By the age of 29, many people had degenerative arthritis. People rarely lived more than 40 years.

Based upon the similarities between the Ancestral Puebloans and modern puebloan people, it is likely that the communities were organized in clans, or groups of related family members, by matrilineal lines of descent. When a couple married, they lived at the home of the wife's mother and the husband engaged in religious activities in the kiva of his mother's clan.

During the Pueblo III period, some people were buried with personal objects, indicating both a level of prestige and evolved religious beliefs. To have earned a higher status within the community infers that the settlements developed hierarchical political and social systems.

- Religious devotion. The number of individual family and "great" kivas, ceremonial objects, and elaborate altars are indicative of a rich and dedicated spiritual life. Kivas, generally men's domain, were used for religious rituals, social activity and weaving. They were generally constructed below the surface of the ground with: a fire pit, overhead entry, spirit entrance or Sipapu, banquette seating and a ventilator shaft. Sometimes adjacent kivas were connected by tunnels. "Great" kivas were constructed for larger community activities. Painted images of men, plants, animals and designs were painted in some kivas, such as the Fire Temple at Mesa Verde. The Fire Temple designs are similar to the ceremonial rooms of the modern Hopi people, specifically the "New Fire" rituals.

It is likely that public ceremonial dances were performed for bountiful harvests, health, hunting and rain, like the Hopi Snake Dance. Whatever the ceremonial observance, each person had a role which increased in responsibility and status over time.

Carved petroglyphs and painted pictographs are also found in the cliffs, buildings and boulders of the pueblo society. The designs were often of animals, people, plants and geometric images. Hovenweep National Monument had two superior kiva wall murals of the Pueblo III period which are now conserved at the Anasazi Heritage Center.

== Agriculture ==
As a means to improve agricultural yield, the Pueblo III period saw advancements in water conservation. Stones were placed in and around farm land to divert flow for irrigation, water conservation and to reduce run-off. This was accomplished through the use of bordered gardens, reservoirs, check dams and terraced gardening plots – building upon the techniques of the Pueblo II period. Corn, beans and squash were cultivated using dryland farming techniques. Their diet was supplemented with wild plants, such as beeweed. As nutrients were depleted from over-farming, new land was found and cleared for cultivation.

== Pottery ==
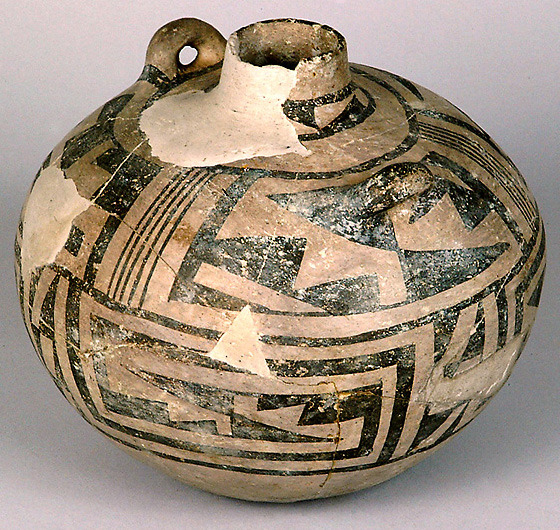
A canteen (pot), dated about AD 1075 to 1300, excavated from the ruins in Chaco Canyon, New Mexico.

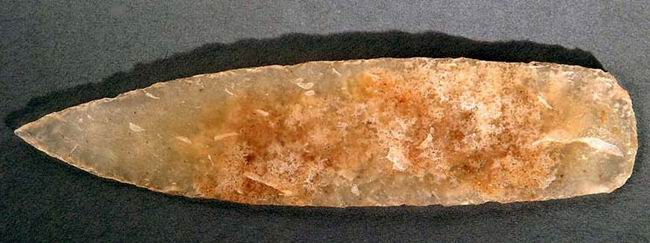
Chalcedony Knife (AD 1000–1200) from Chaco Culture National Historical Park

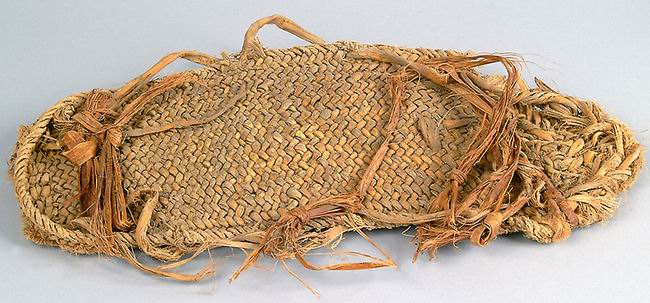
12th century sandal from Chaco Culture National Historical Park

Corrugated gray ware and decorated black-on-white pottery were prevalent in the beginning of the period. Gray pottery vessels were used for cooking and storage. Designs, primarily geometric designs and symbols of people, animals and birds, were painted on the exterior of black-on-white pottery and the interior of bowls. The pottery made included cooking vessels, jars, mugs, bowls, pitchers, and ladles. Pottery making became an art form for individuals who specialized in distinctive styles made for trade. Polychrome (multiple colored) pottery painted in white, orange, red and black was made at the end of the Pueblo III period.

Due to the considerable refinements during this period, pottery from Mesa Verde and Chaco Canyon are considered "some of the world's finest ceramic art, ancient or modern."

== Other material goods ==
Some of the material goods from this period are:

- Stone tools. Men gathered hard stone from mountains, river beds or nearby boulders for stone tools:

- axes for cutting down trees
- hammerstones for shaping sandstone blocks
- projectile points for bow and arrow hunting
- knives to cut plants and animal hides
- manos and metates for grinding corn, plants, nuts and seeds.

- Bone tools. Deer, sheep, rabbit and other animal bones were also shaped for tools, such as stitching awls for making clothing, working hides and weaving. Bones were also used for scrapers and fleshers.
- Yucca, a regionally bountiful, drought-resistant plant, was used to make many household goods. Its fibers were used for sewing, cordage and woven into blankets, clothing, sandals and baskets. Sharp barbs were used as needles or made into paint brushes. It was also used as soap and a source of food.
- Cotton cloth. Cotton was obtained through trading, dyed and woven into material by men for clothing.
- Stone and shell ornaments. Jewellery and other ornaments were made from bartered shells and stones from the coasts of Mexico and California. Within the region, turquoise, soapstone and lignite were attained through trade. Just as pottery from this period has received world-wide recognition, shell and turquoise-inlay work from this period was noteworthy for its artisanry.
- Other items obtained through trade. Aside from cotton, shell and stones, the people of the third Pueblo period could also barter for cloth, salt, and pottery.

== Great migration ==
By 1300, Ancient Pueblo People from the Four Corners region abandoned their settlements. The migration was likely as the result of prolonged drought from AD 1276 to 1299 which would have caused considerable hardship, such as starvation, raids from neighboring starving people, and dramatic reduction in the pueblo population. During and after the drought there was a mass exodus south to central and southern Arizona and New Mexico.

There are other theories about why people forever abandoned the northern pueblo regions. Soil nutrients may have become depleted due to many years of farming. Or there may have been wars with other regional tribes.

== Cultural groups and periods ==
The cultural groups of this period include:

- Ancestral Puebloans – southern Utah, southern Colorado, northern Arizona and northern and central New Mexico.
- Hohokam – southern Arizona.
- Mogollon – southeastern Arizona, southern New Mexico and northern Mexico.
- Patayan – western Arizona, California and Baja California.

== Pueblo III sites ==
| Arizona | Colorado | New Mexico | Utah |
|---|---|---|---|
| Bailey Ruin; Canyon de Chelly; Case Grande; Cohonina; Glen Canyon; Grand Canyon; Mesa Grande; Navajo Pueblos; Oraibi | Canyons of the Ancients; Chimney Rock; Hawkins Pueblo; Hovenweep; La Plata River valley Mesa Verde; Ute Mountain; Yucca House | Aztec Ruins; Bandelier; Chaco Canyon; Gila Cliff Dwellings; Pecos area Puye Cliff Dwellings | Alkali Ridge; Comb Ridge; Glen Canyon; Hovenweep |

== Gallery ==
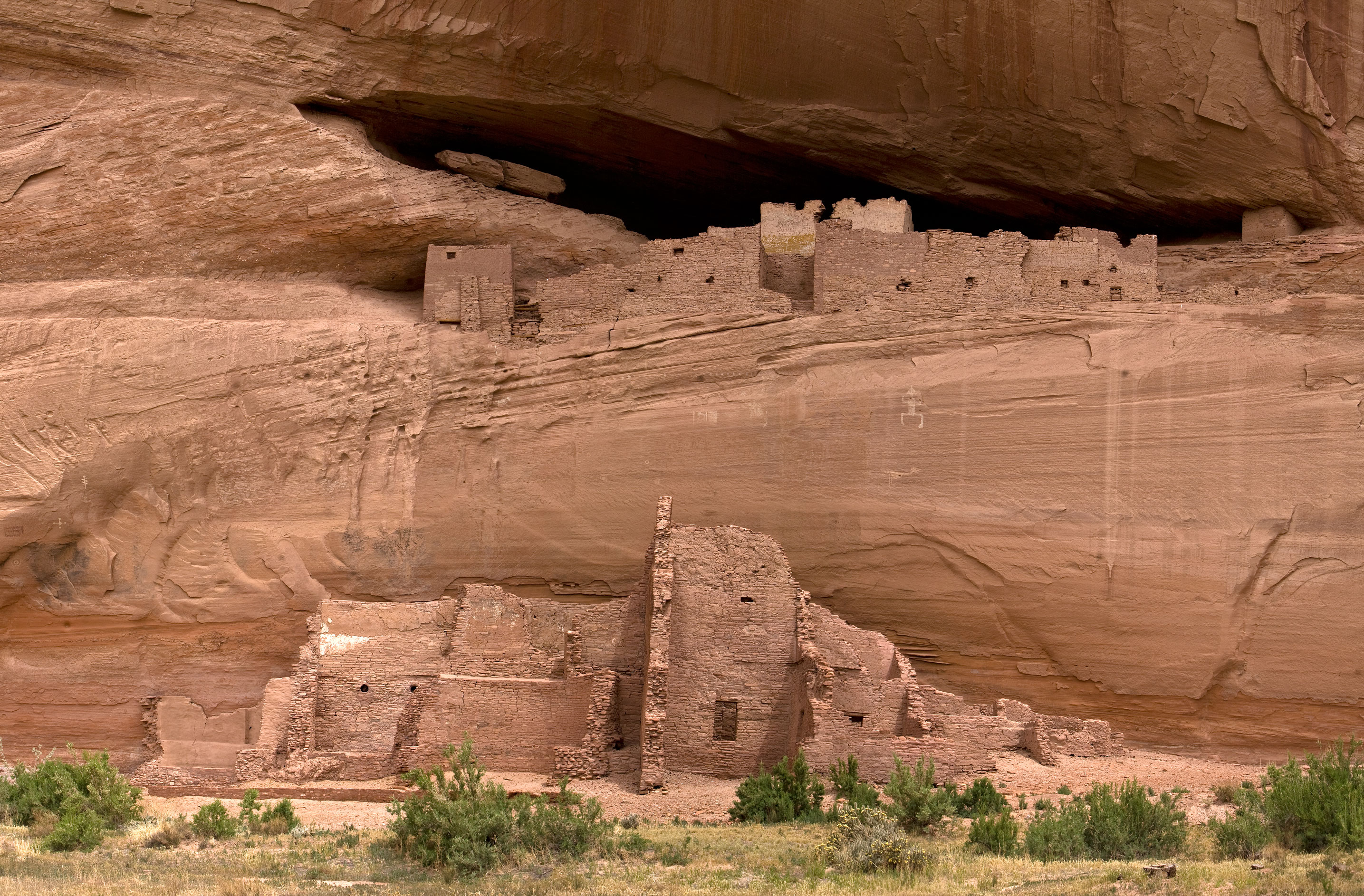
White House ruins in Canyon de Chelly National Monument

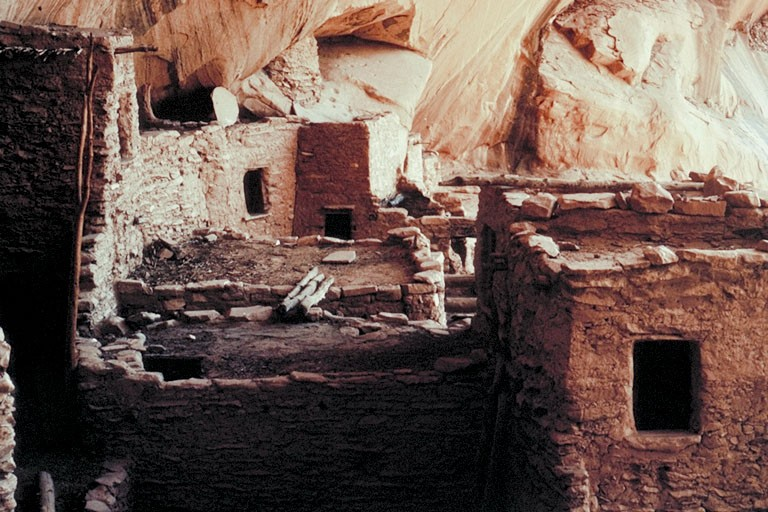
Keet Seel cliff dwellings at Navajo National Monument

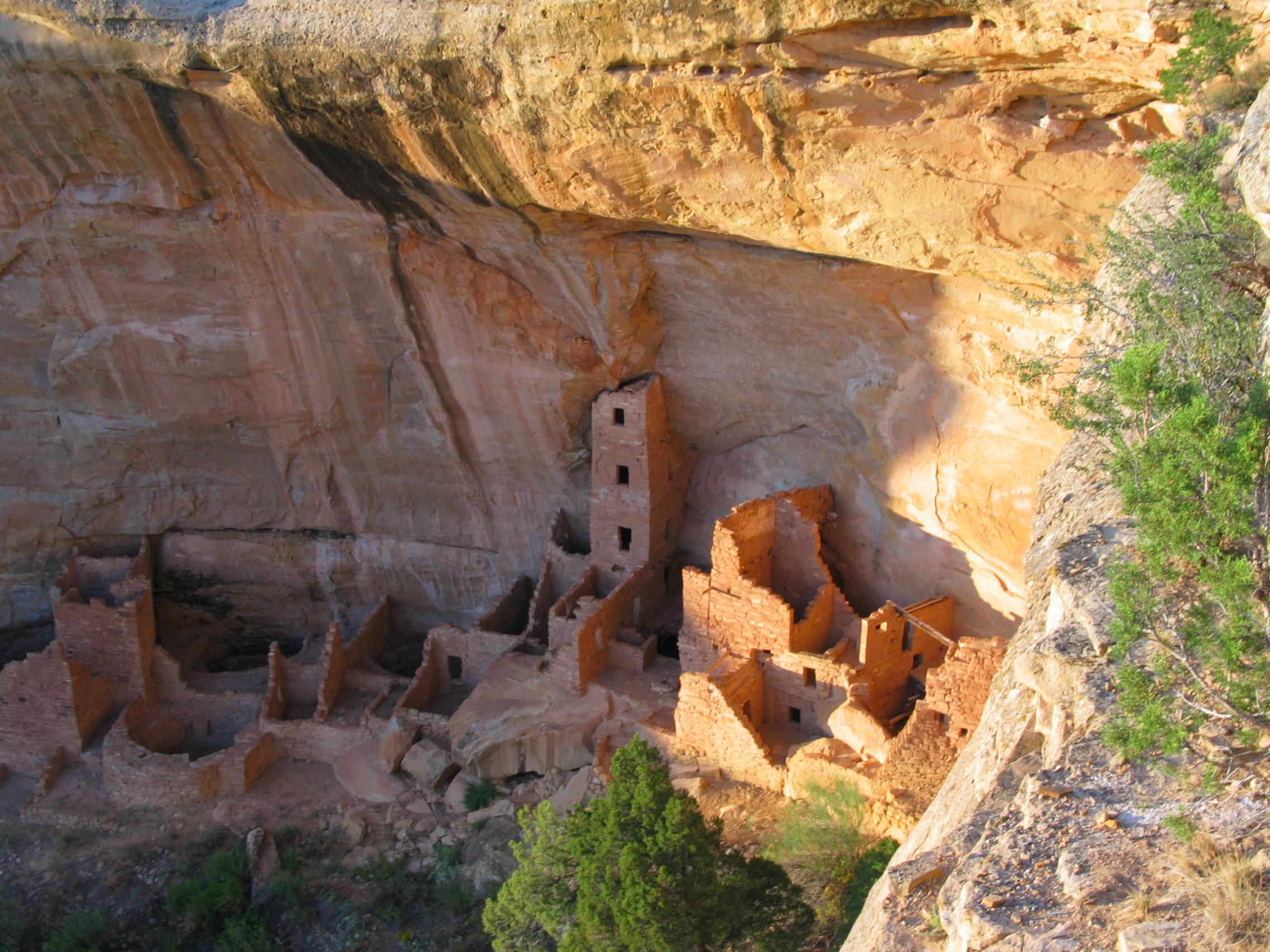
Overhead view of Square Tower House at Mesa Verde National Park

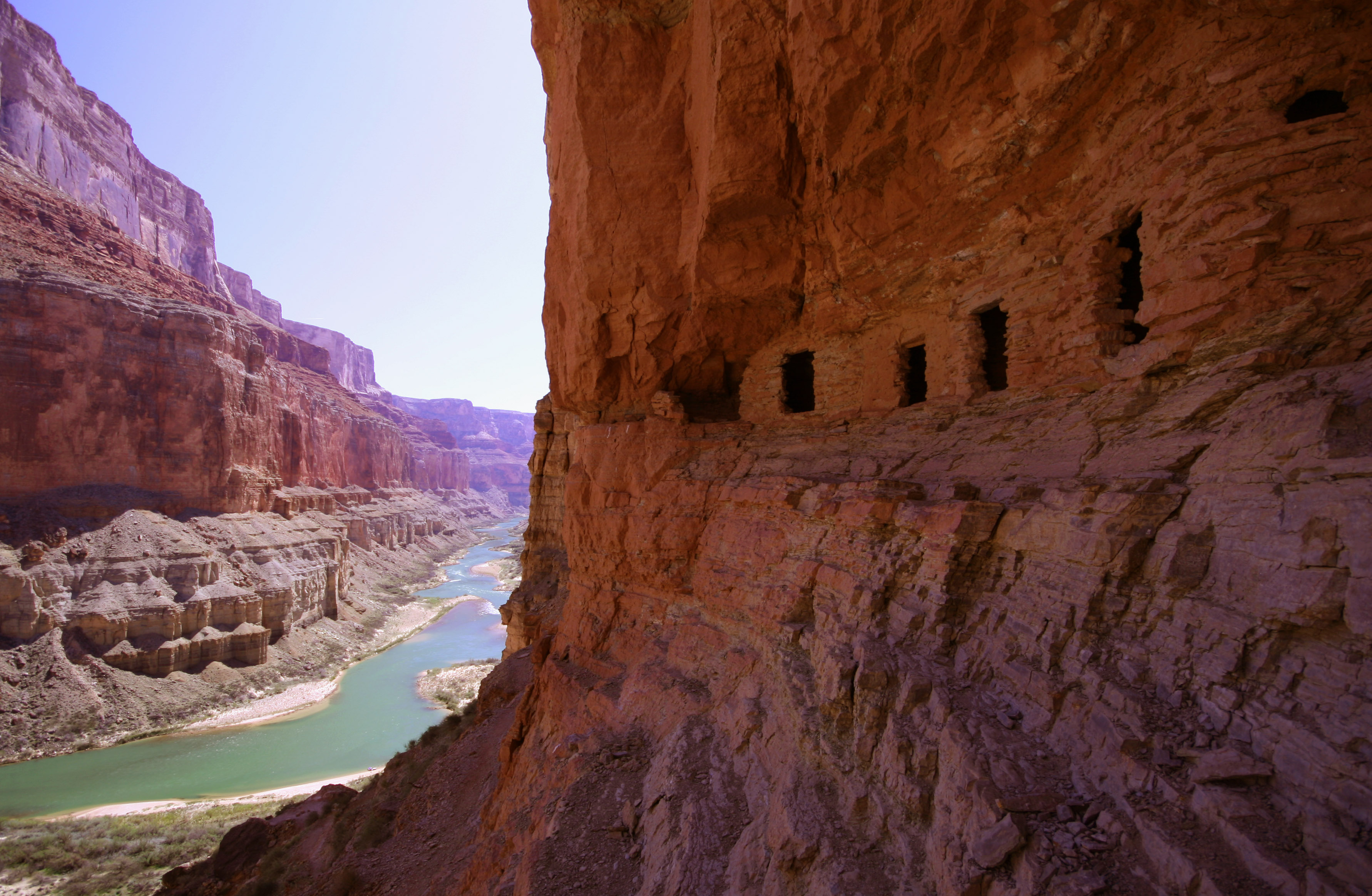
Nankoweap ruins, Grand Canyon National Park in Arizona

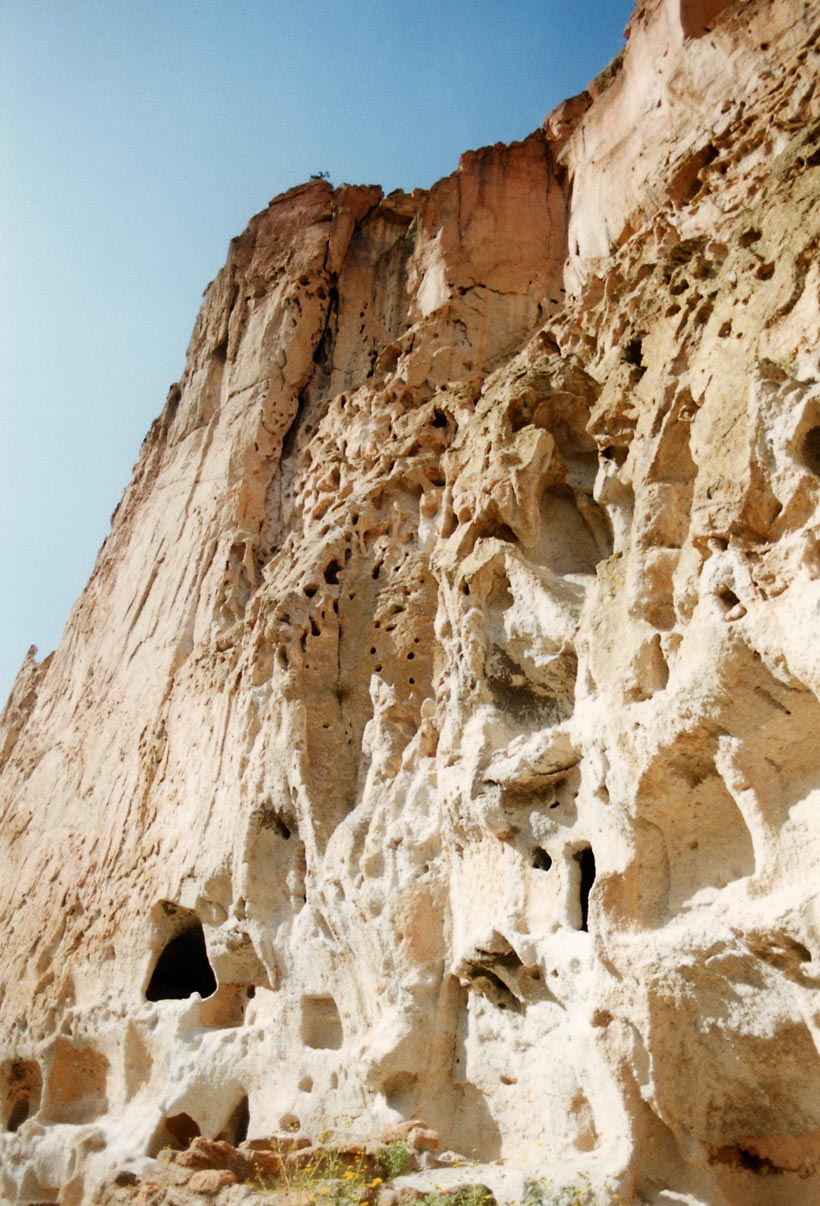
Cliffs at Bandelier National Monument in New Mexico

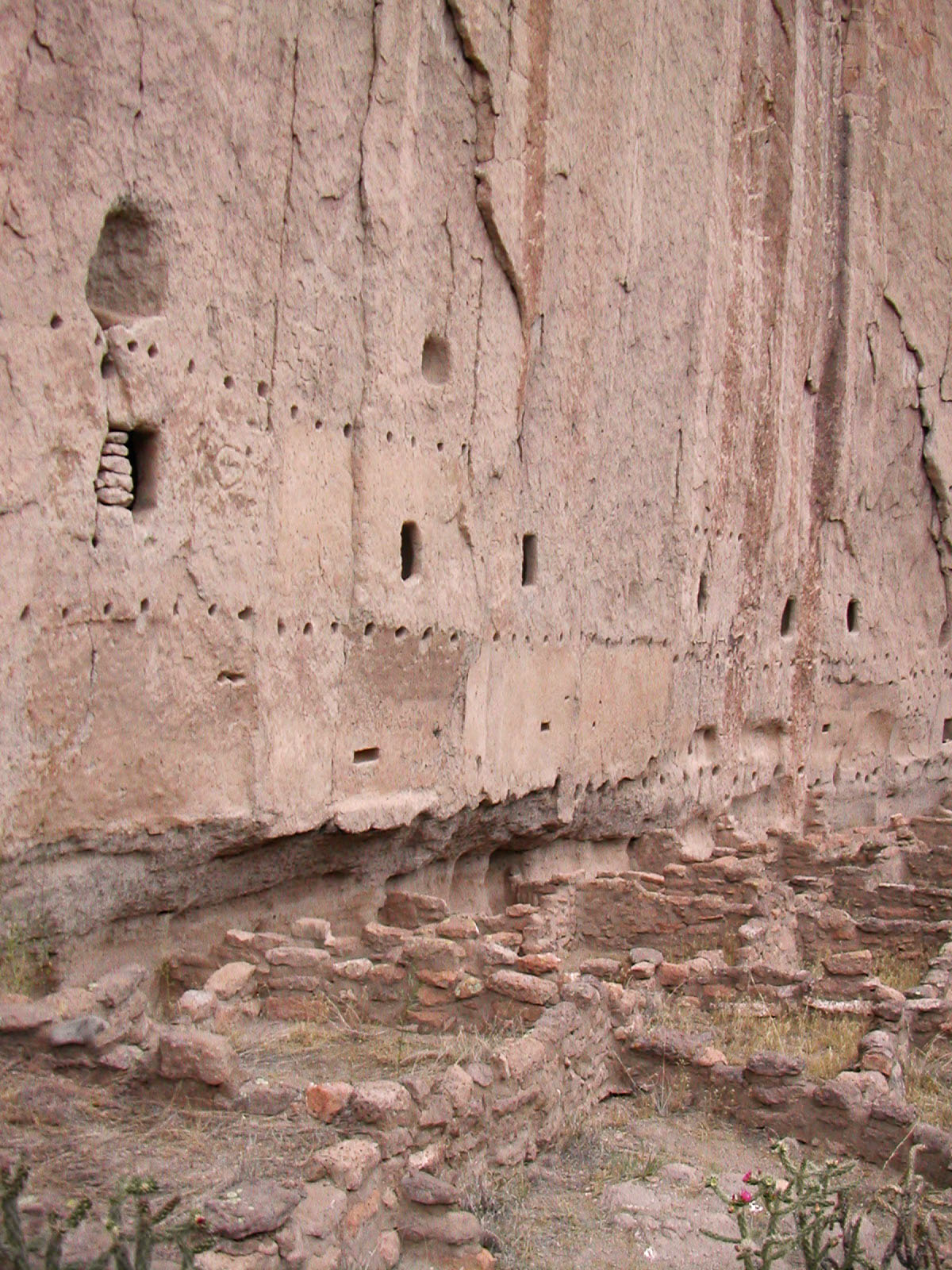
Houses at Bandelier National Monument in New Mexico

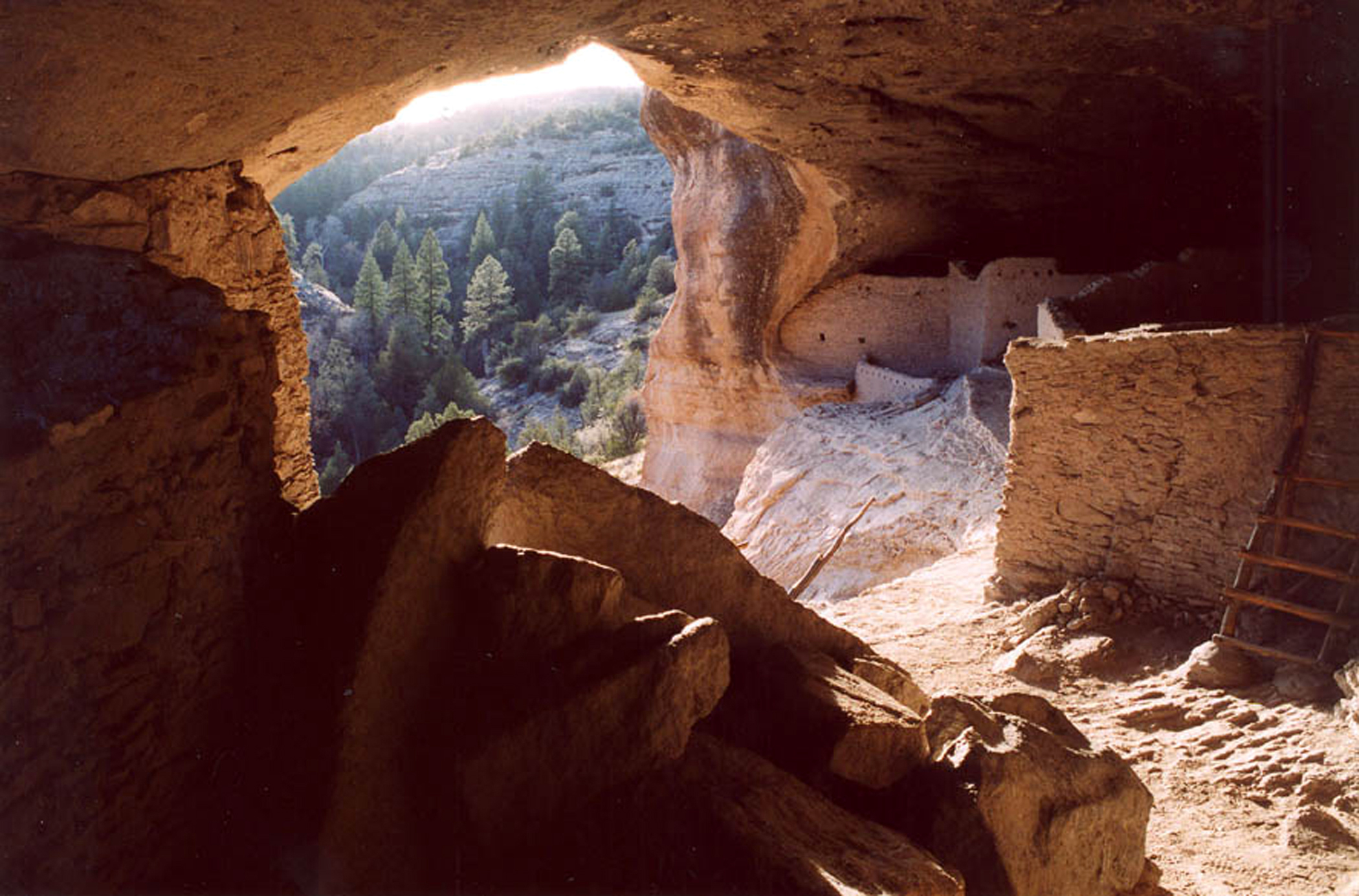
Interior of cliff dwellings at Gila Cliff Dwellings National Monument

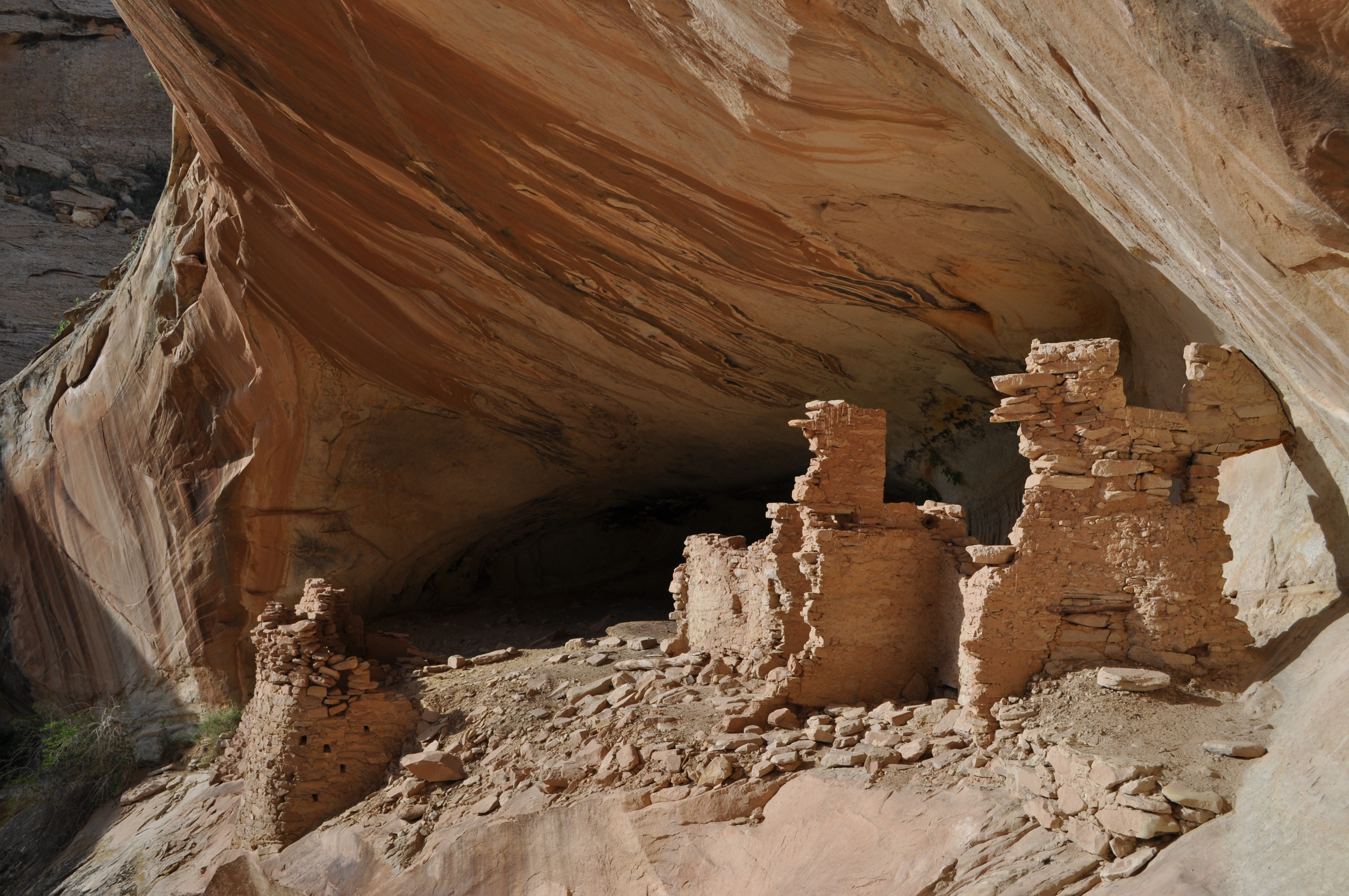
Monarch Cave Ruin at Comb Ridge, Utah

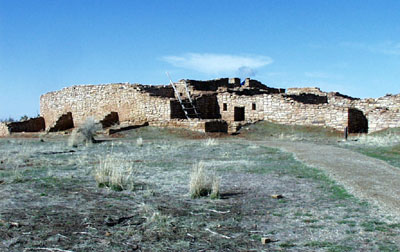
Lowry Pueblo in southwestern Colorado

Hovenweep Castle at Hovenweep National Monument

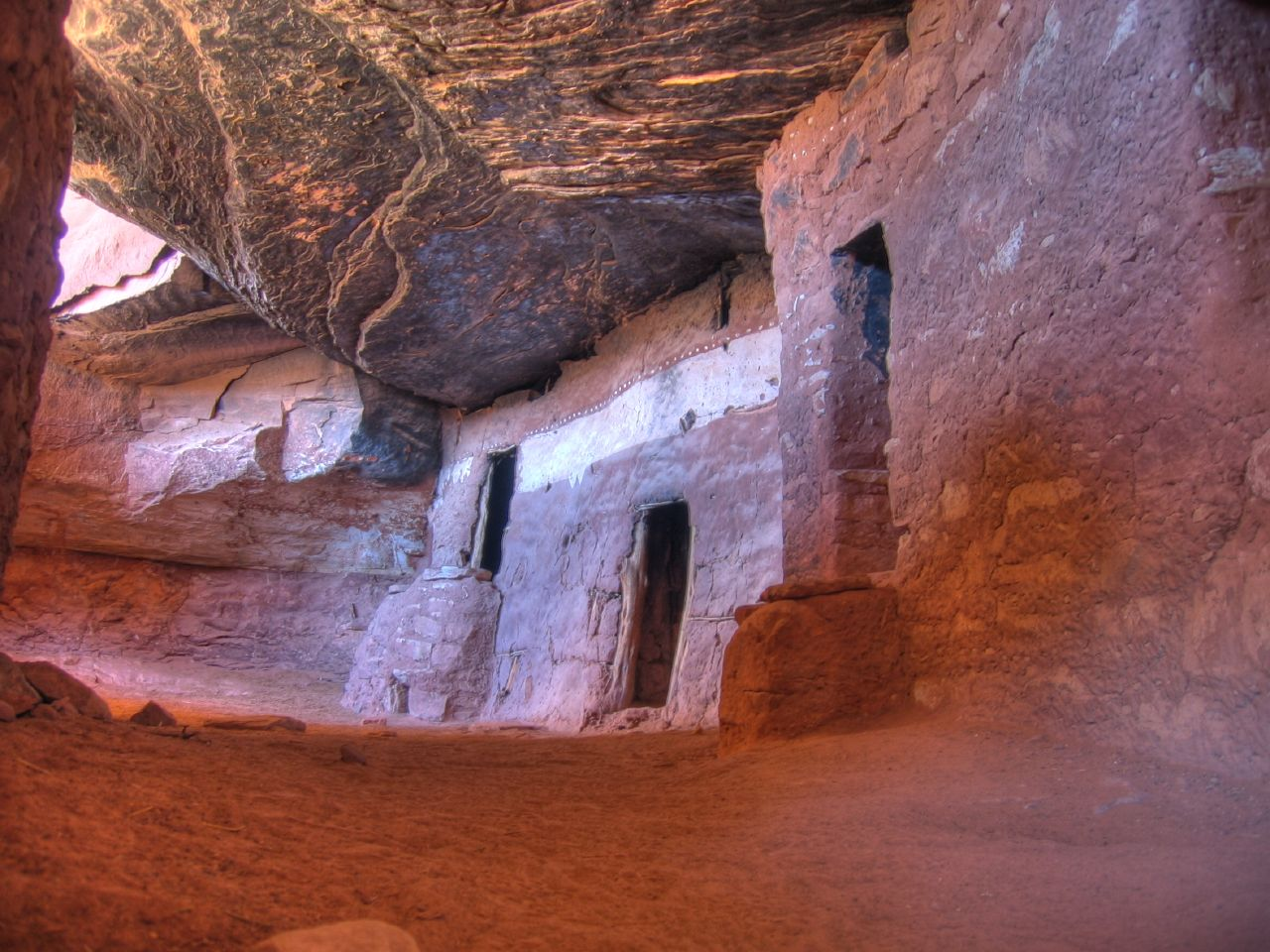
Moon House on Cedar Mesa in Utah

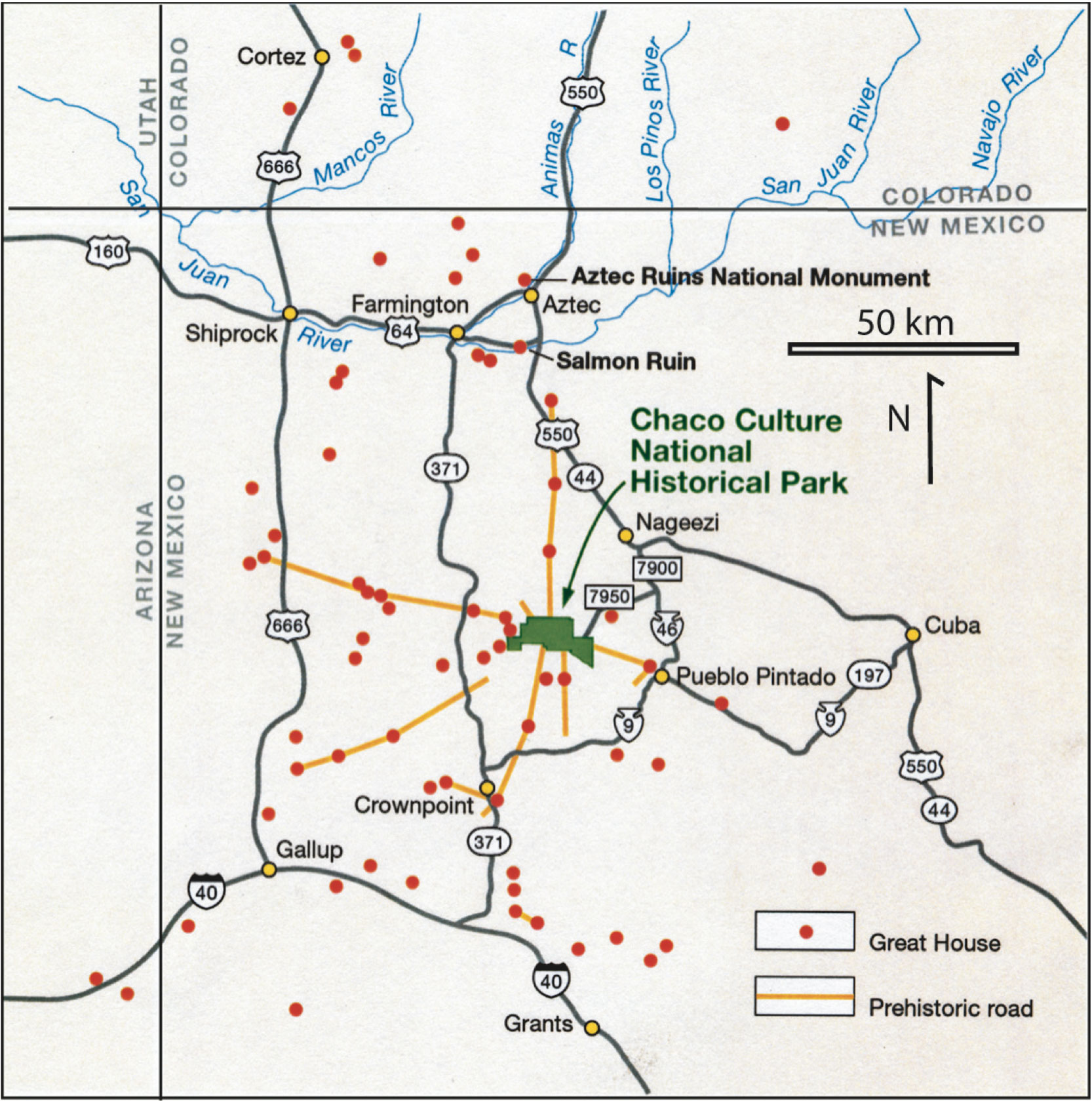
Prehistoric roads and Great Houses in the San Juan Basin, superimposed on a map showing modern roads and settlements.
