= Bailey Ruin =

Archaeological site in Arizona, United States

- U.S. National Register of Historic Places
- Nearest city: Pinedale
- Area: 12.4 acres (5.0 ha)
- Architectural style: Pueblo
- NRHP reference No.: 05001560
- Added to NRHP: March 17, 2006

Bailey Ruin is an archaeological site located in Navajo County, Arizona, United States. The site, also known as "Stott Ranch Ruin" and "Pope Ranch Site," was added to the National Register of Historic Places on March 17, 2006 for its historical and archaeological significance.

Bailey Ruin, a well-preserved Ancient Puebloan site, was occupied from about AD 1275 to 1325, in the late Pueblo III Era to early Pueblo IV Era.

== Geography ==
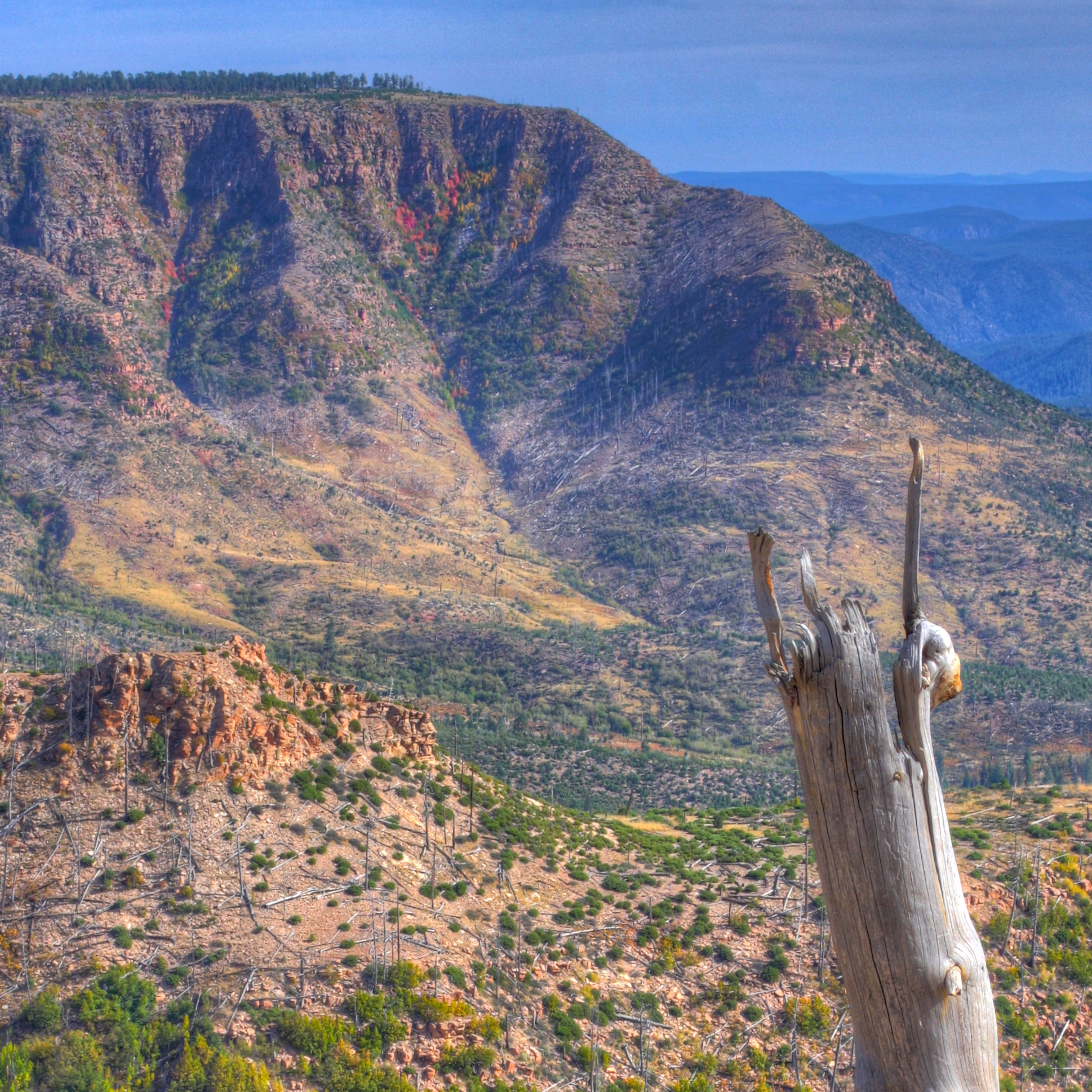
View of Mogollon Rim, east of Pine, Arizona

The Bailey Ruins are located mainly in a ponderosa forest in the Apache-Sitgreaves National Forests and partly on a private ranch, about 1.6 miles (2.6 km) from the Mogollon Rim at 6,808 feet (2,075 m) in elevation.

== Pueblo site ==
The site was a multi-storied complex of 200 to 250 rooms that appeared to grow gradually in size from AD 1275 to 1325. Around the turn of the 14th century, the plaza was enclosed by the addition of clusters of rooms. The site had several water sources: a cienega about 660 feet (200 m) from the pueblo and nearby springs. Currently there are shallow historic wells.

== Archaeology ==
Archaeological interest in the site began before the turn of the 20th century.

- J. Walter Fewkes who led an expedition for the Smithsonian Bureau of American Ethnology, visited the site in 1897 and referred to the site as the "Stott Ranch Ruin".
- Emil W. Haury visited the site in 1927 and 1929, first for the Gila Pueblo Archaeological Foundation and then for the National Geographic Society Third Beam Expedition. As the ranch changed owners, the site name changed. When Haury visited in 1927 it was named the "Pope Ranch Site" and then it was named for the new owner, George W. Bailey. During Haury's visit in 1927, he conducted a search for tree-ring dating specimens.
- Surveys were conducted in the area during the 1980s.
- Spring Creek Archeological District was conducted in 1993, including excavation of the site.

== See also ==
- Pueblo history
- National Register of Historic Places listings in Navajo County, Arizona
