= Pueblo IV period =

Era in the history of the Pueblo peoples

Map of the Ancestral Puebloans in Oasisamerica. During the Pueblo IV period, Four Corners pueblo settlements were abandoned (northern and central portion of the Ancestral Pueblo region.)

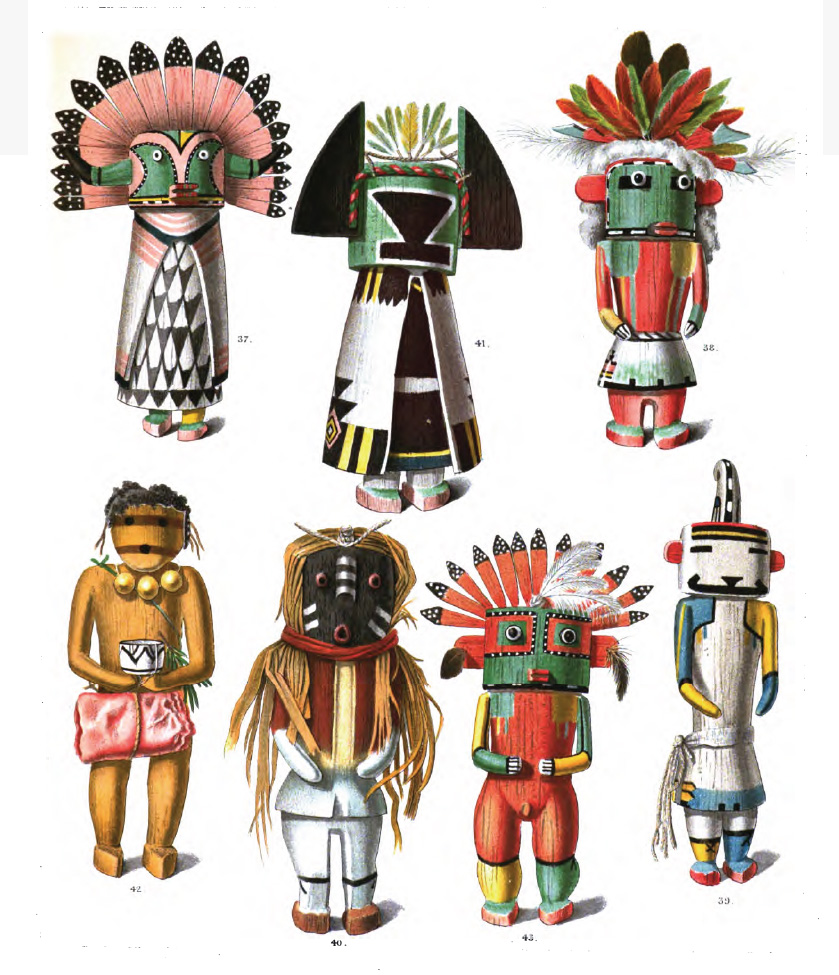
Drawings of kachina dolls, from an 1894 anthropology book.

The Pueblo IV period (1350–1600) was the fourth period of the Ancestral Puebloans in Oasisamerica. At the end of prior Pueblo III period, ancestral Puebloans living in the Colorado and Utah regions abandoned their settlements and migrated south to the Pecos River and Rio Grande valleys. As a result, pueblos in those areas saw a significant increase in total population.

The Pueblo IV period (Pecos Classification) is similar to the "Regressive Pueblo period" or, referring to the Ancestral Puebloans of Colorado and Utah, the "post-Pueblo period." It is preceded by Pueblo III and is followed by the present Pueblo V period.

== Architecture ==
Puebloan villages in Arizona and New Mexico had multi-storied pueblos of up to a thousand clustered rooms. The New Mexico villages were generally larger than those of western region, which had large plazas with long, rectangular kivas.

== Communities ==
The great migration out of Colorado and Utah at the end of the Pueblo III period resulted in an influx of people into the Rio Grande and Little Colorado River valleys. Within Arizona and New Mexico there was an aggregation of people from outlying sites to larger pueblos. The puebloan territory of the Pueblo IV period also included the White Mountains, Verde Valley, Anderson Mesa, and Pecos areas.

- Rio Grande valley. Many puebloan people were found in the Rio Grande Valley, including the Acoma Pueblo and Zuni Pueblo areas, when the Spanish arrived about 1540.
- Bandelier area pueblos experienced considerable construction, increased population and improved standard of living after 1300. Black-on-white pottery excavated at Bandelier was indistinguishable from that of the Mesa Verde National Park, indicating that at least some of the new residents came from Mesa Verde.
- Abandoned communities. Many of the sites of the early Pueblo IV period were abandoned by the 15th century, such as those in the White Mountains, Verde Valley, Middle Little Colorado River and Anderson Mesa. Petrified Forest villages were generally abandoned by the late 16th century. The land continued to be used for its resources and for travel.
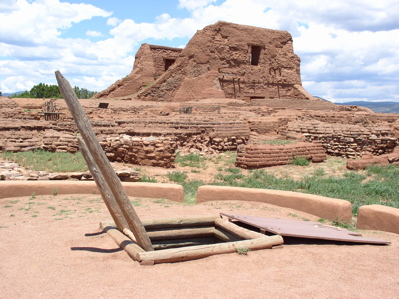
Pecos National Historic Park

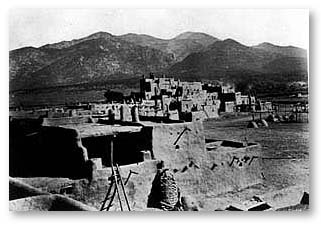
Taos Pueblo 1880

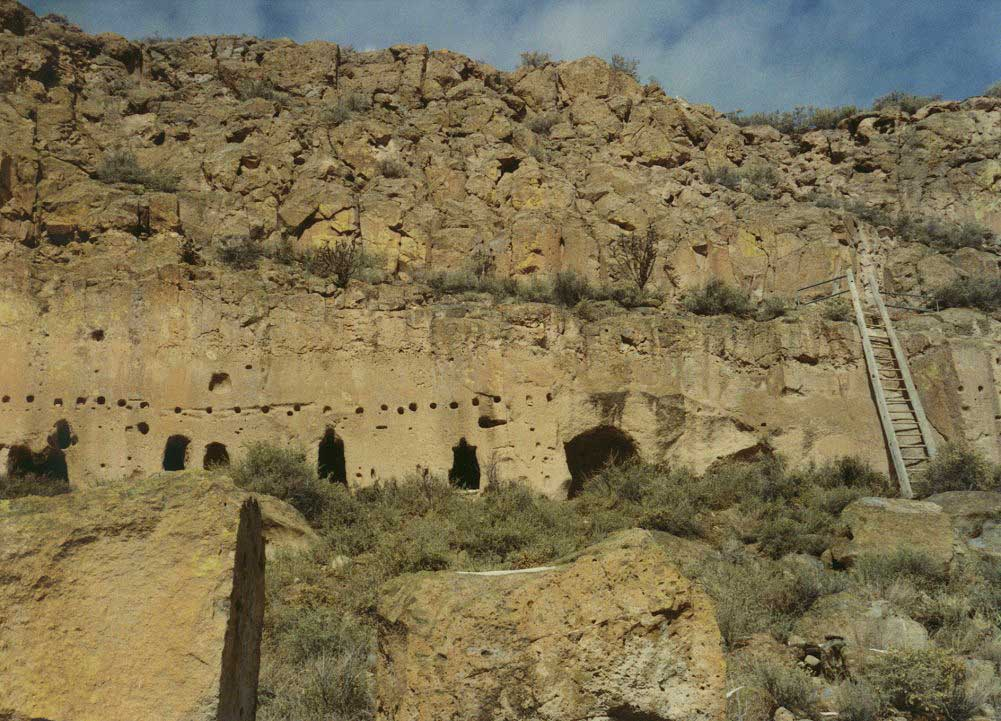
Puye Cliff Dwellings

== Spanish colonization ==
An upsurge in the lifestyle of the Rio Grande valley residents in the beginning of the Pueblo IV period was tempered by the 16th century Spanish colonization of the Americas which extended north into New Mexico. Juan de Oñate, the colonial governor of New Mexico in New Spain, led 400 soldiers and farmers in 1598 to establish settlements into the Rio Grande valley area.

== Culture and religion ==
- The people of the Frijoles Canyon in Bandelier area in the 14th century had black hair and red-brown skin and were short in stature, an average of about 5 feet and 4 inches tall for men. Women were about 5 feet tall. Generally, couples had a few children. Domesticated dogs were often part of a family's household.
- Religion. The Ancestral Puebloans integrated Kachina religious rituals into their lives by 1300. This helped to integrate diverse groups of people who migrated into the area and inhabited the large pueblos. The culture inspired a life of mutual cooperation, food sharing and religious rituals, such as rain-making. Kachina images appeared in murals in kivas, pictographs and petroglyphs. The Kachina religion was foundational for modern Zuni and Hopi people.

== Agriculture ==
Sites were located next to reliable water sources which were often used to irrigate farm land. Gardens were established in terraces and stone-outlined "waffle gardens" near the pueblo. Once harvested, maize was ground using manos and metates. The presence of griddle stones hints at the creation of baked paper-like cornbread.

Small game and birds were hunted or trapped and seasonal wild plants were gathered to supplement the diet:

- Spring – beeweed and mustard greens
- Summer – chokecherries, currants, gooseberries and raspberries, yucca fruit
- Fall – seeds, nuts, juniper berries and prickly pears

== Pottery ==
Plain surfaced pottery replaced the corrugated pottery of the Pueblo II and Pueblo III periods. Red, yellow, and orange ware and polychrome (multiple-colored) pottery replaced black-on-white pottery of the previous pueblo periods. The pottery was often mass-produced, high quality pottery, and in the case of the western Ancestral Pueblo, included Kachina figure and symbol designs. Glazed pots, created when mineral paints on the pottery surface were fired at high temperatures, emerged in the Ancestral Pueblo sites. Artisans in the Petrified Forest created sophisticated Glaze-on-Red polychrome pottery.

== Other material goods ==
Emerging material goods during this period were small triangular projectile points and piki stones for making bread.

== Cultural groups and periods ==
The cultural groups of this period include:

- Ancestral Puebloans – southern Utah, southern Colorado, northern Arizona and northern and central New Mexico.
- Hohokam – southern Arizona.
- Mogollon – southeastern Arizona, southern New Mexico and northern Mexico.
- Patayan – western Arizona, California and Baja California.

== Notable Pueblo IV sites ==
Arizona	Rio Grande Valley, New Mexico	Other New Mexico
Awatovi Ruins; Bailey Ruin; Casa Grande; Mesa Grande; Oraibi; Pueblo Grande	Acoma Pueblo; Cochiti Pueblo; Isleta Pueblo; Jemez Pueblo; Kewa Pueblo (Santa Domingo Pueblo); Laguna Pueblo; Nambé Pueblo; Ohkay Owingeh Pueblo (San Juan Pueblo); Picuris Pueblo; Pojoaque Pueblo; San Felipe Pueblo; San Ildefonso Pueblo; Sandia Pueblo; Santa Ana Pueblo; Santa Clara Pueblo; Tesuque Pueblo; Taos Pueblo; Zia Pueblo; Zuni Pueblo	Puye Cliff Dwellings; Bandelier area Pecos area

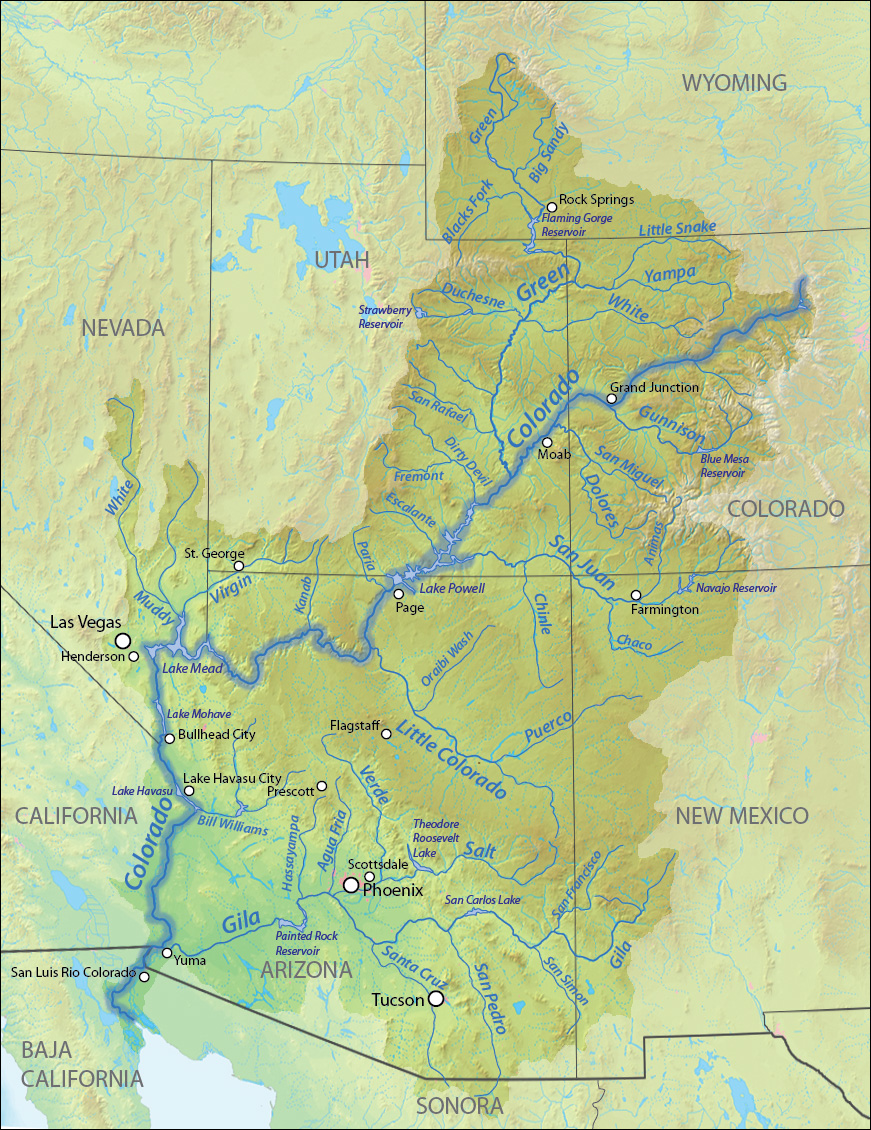
Colorado River tributaries

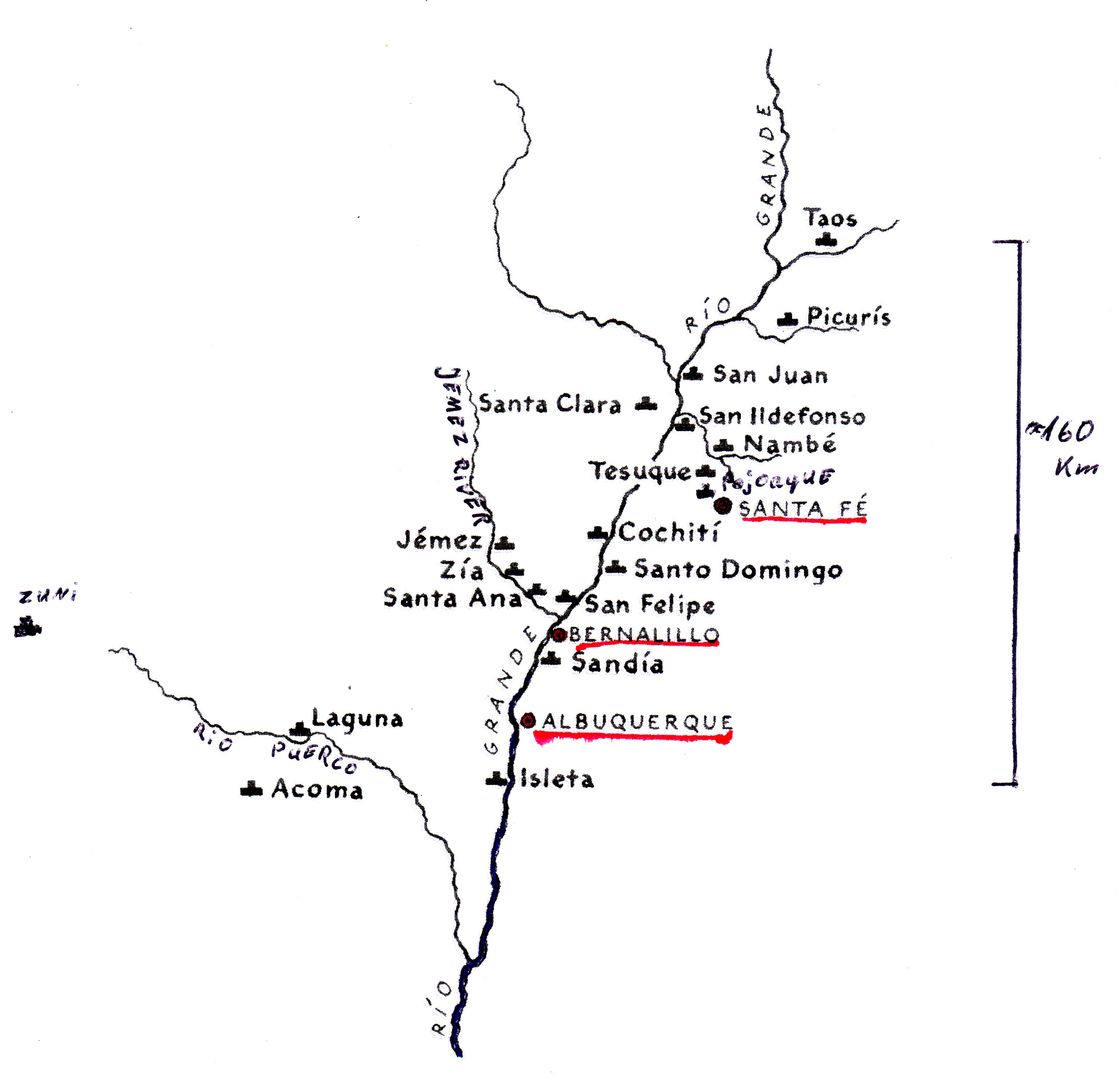
Pueblos in the Rio Grande valley

== Gallery ==
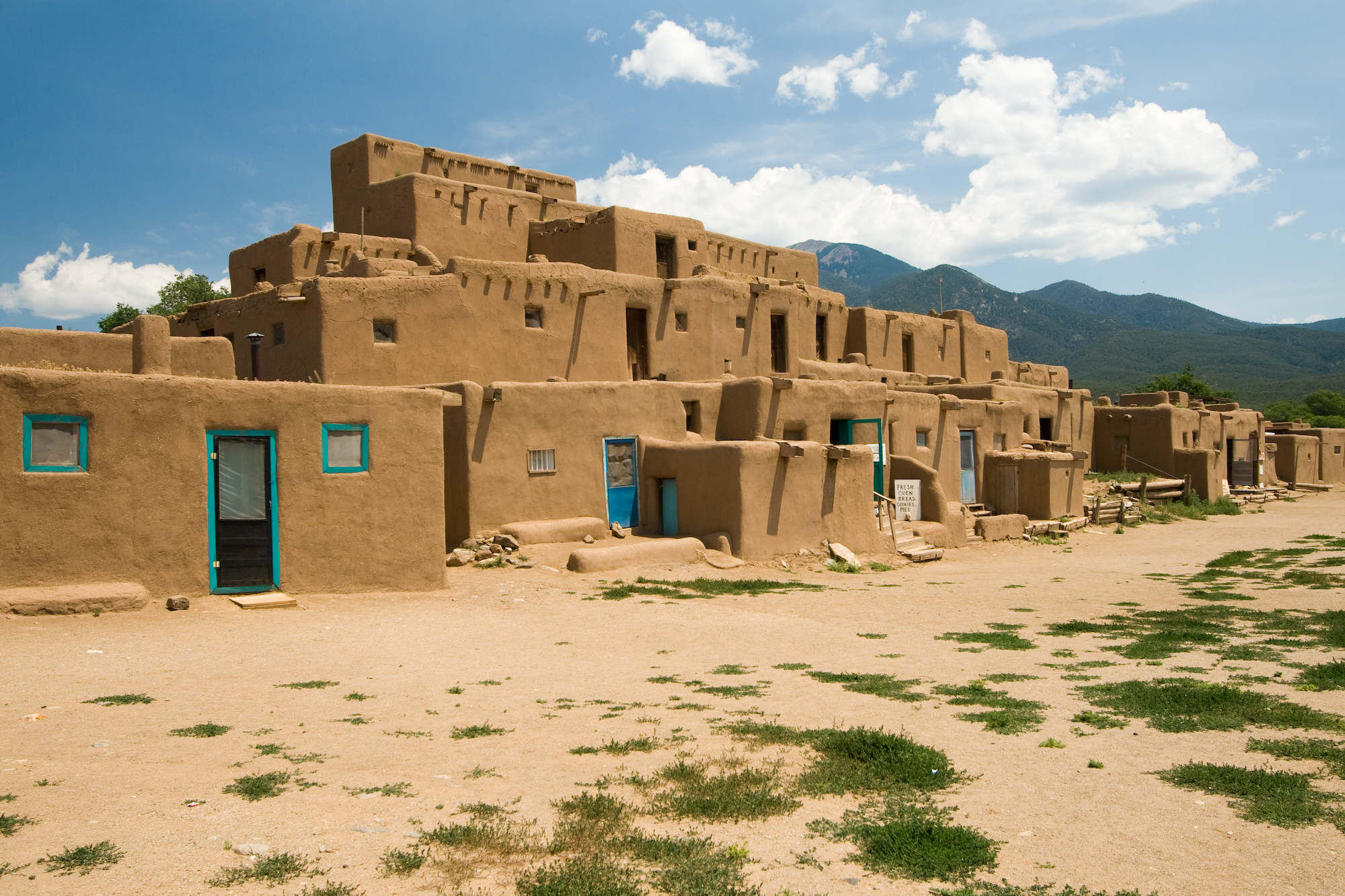
Taos Pueblo

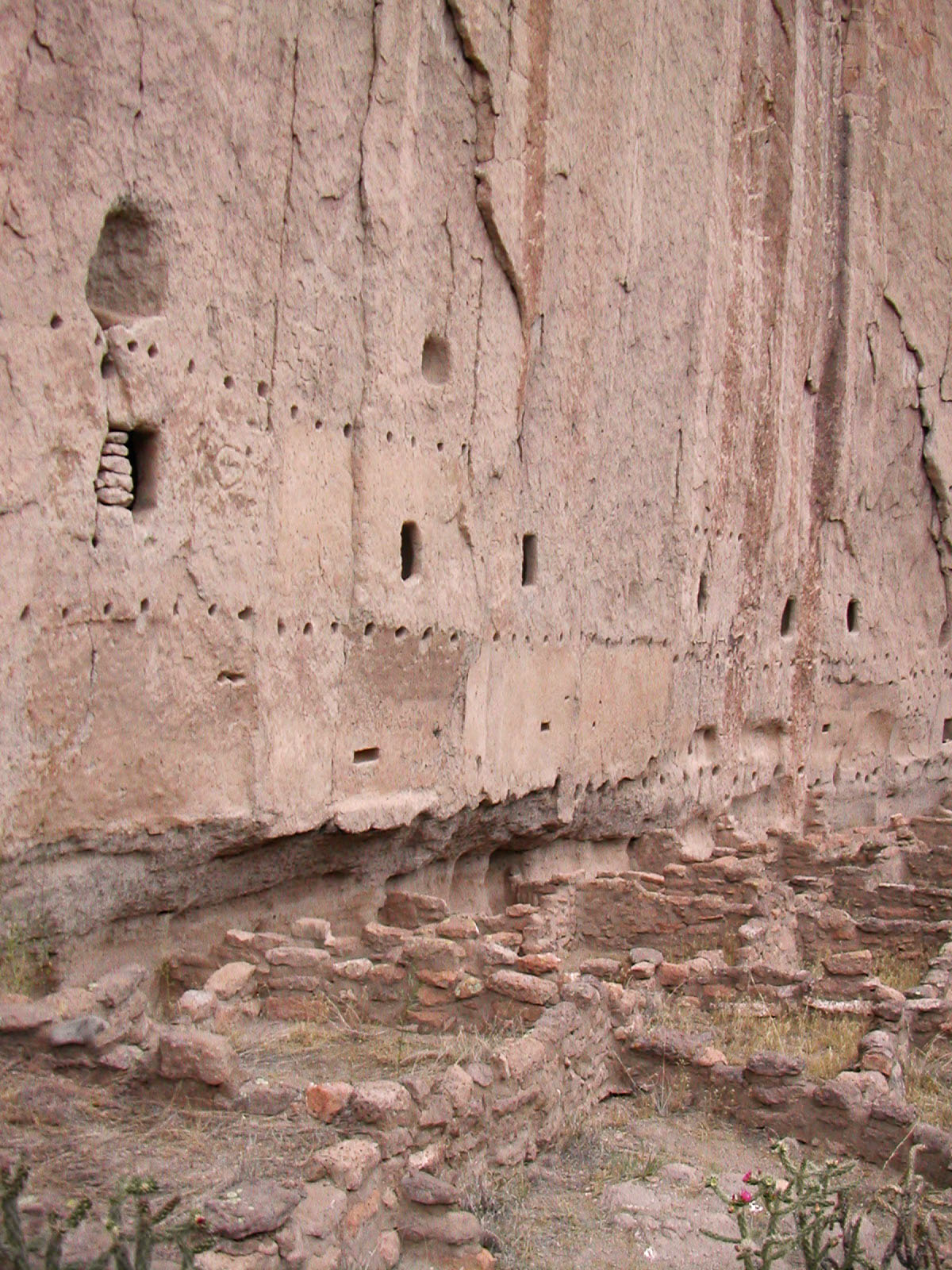
Bandelier National Monument ruins

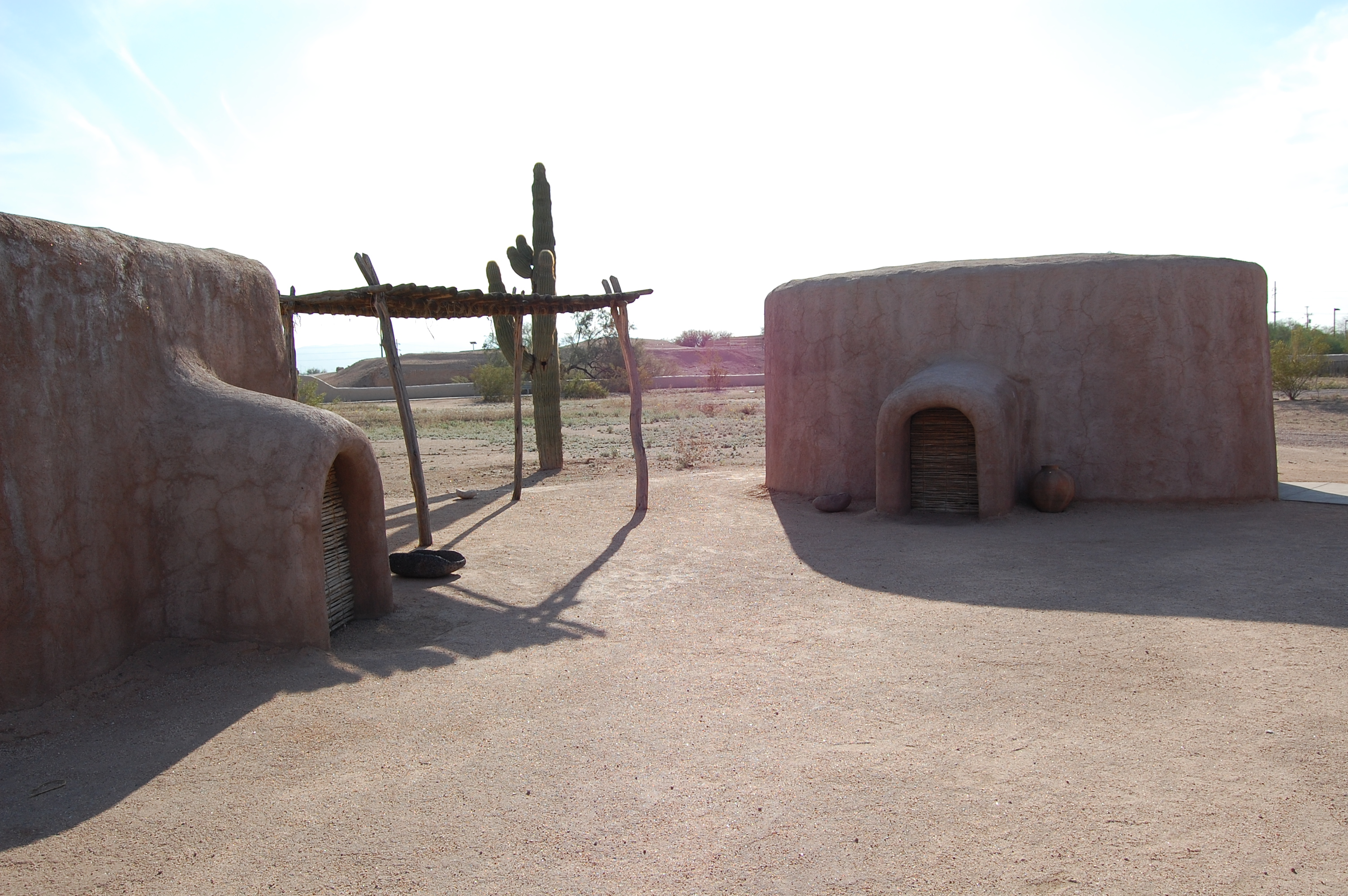
Pueblo Grande, Arizona

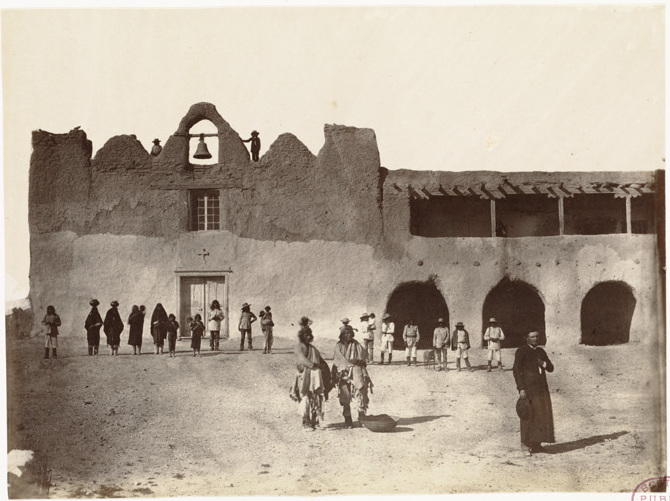

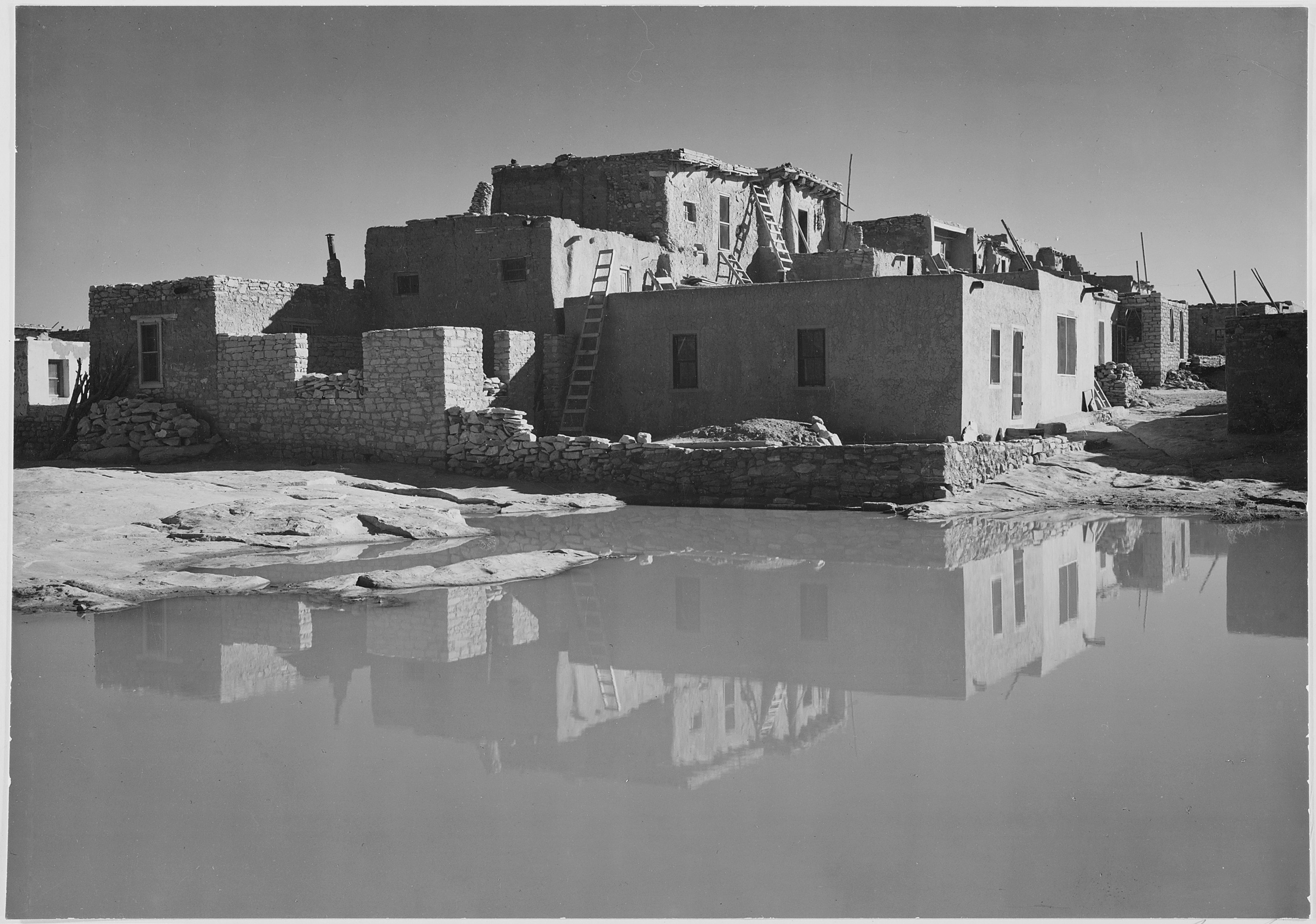
Acoma Pueblo, Ansel Adams

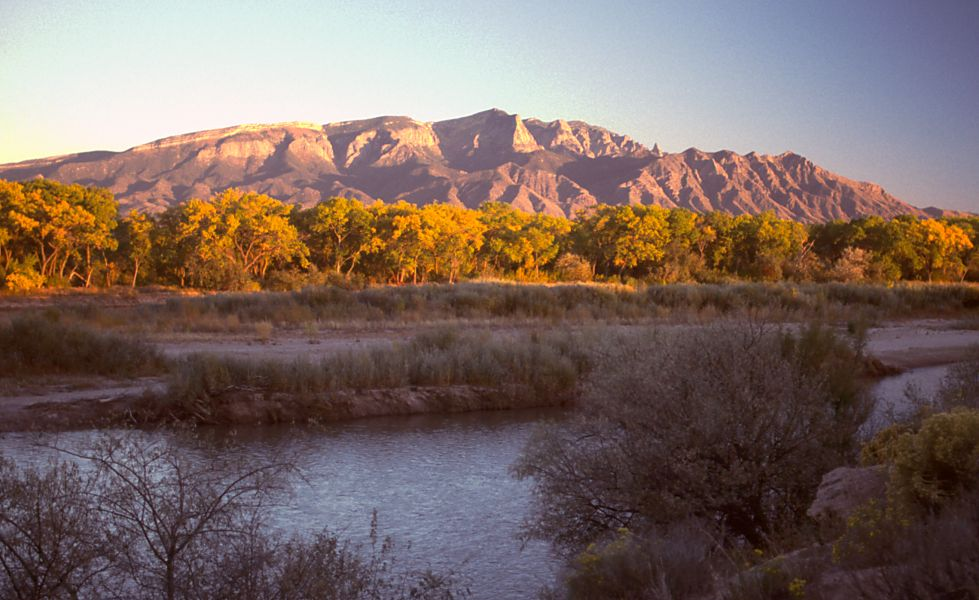
Sandia Mountains, sacred land of the Sandia Pueblo people

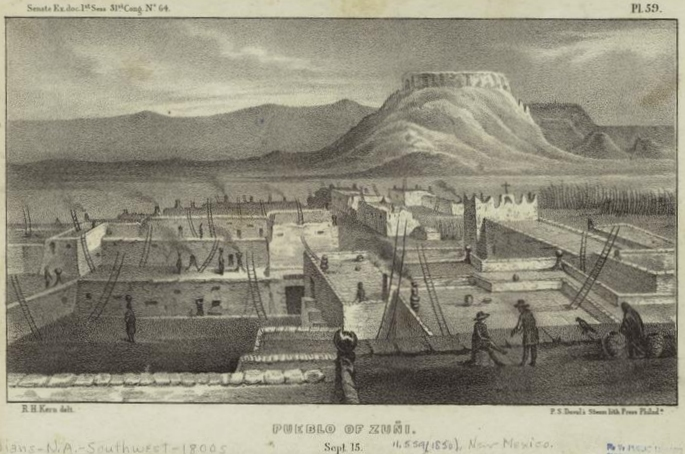
Zuni Pueblo, 1850 illustration
