= Hawkins Preserve =

Conservation easement in Colorado

Coordinates: 37.33412°N 108.59355°W

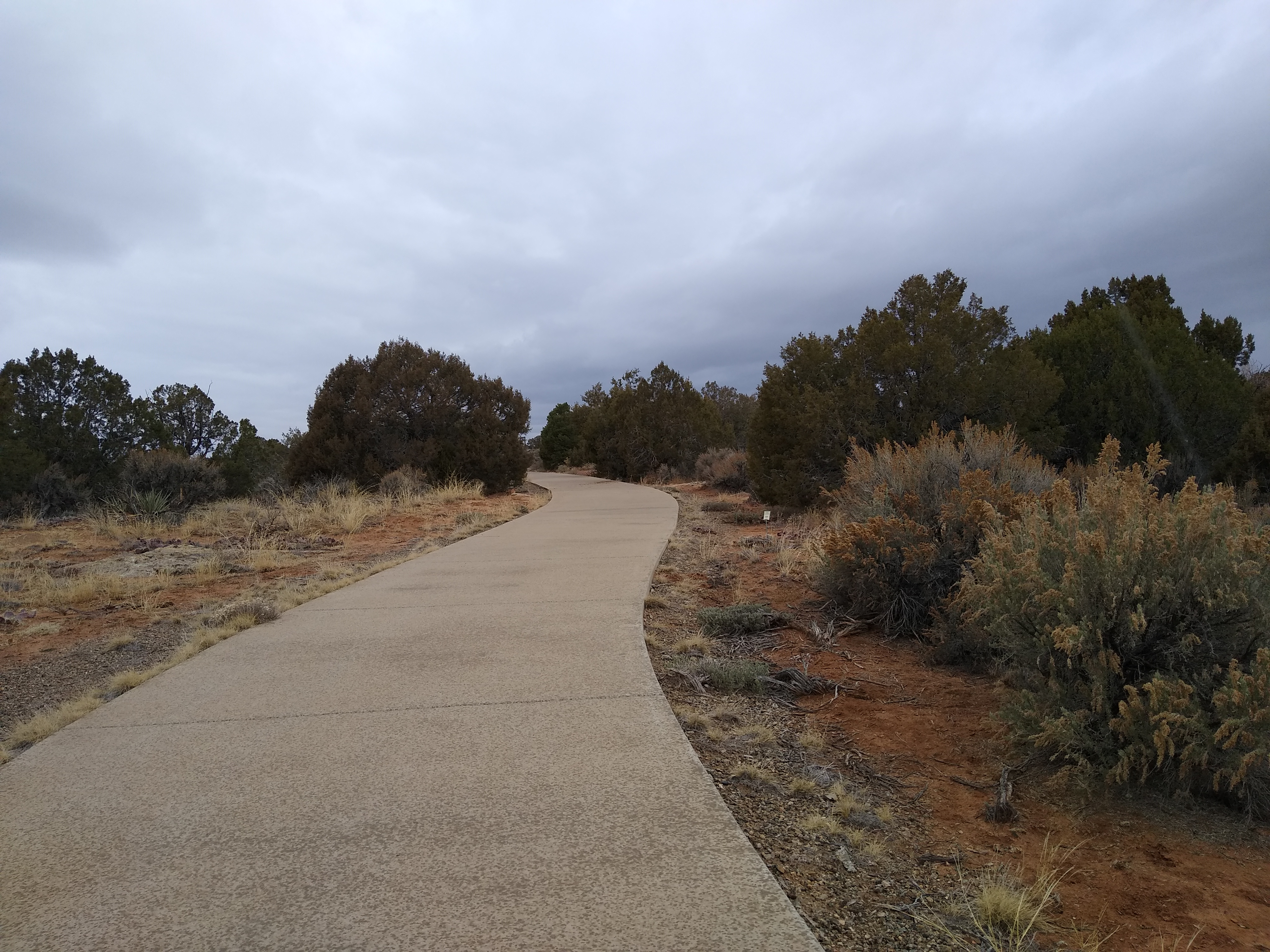
Walking path in Hawkins Preserve

Hawkins Preserve is a 122-acre (0.49 km^{2}) property within the city limits of Cortez, Colorado. It is protected by a conservation easement held by the Montezuma Land Conservancy.

The property for the preserve was donated to the Cortez Cultural Center in the 1990s by Jack Hawkins which includes:

- Biological and botanical resources in a pinion-juniper woodland that is bounded by sandstone potholes and McElmo Creek.
- Prehistoric archaeological sites.

== Nature preserve ==
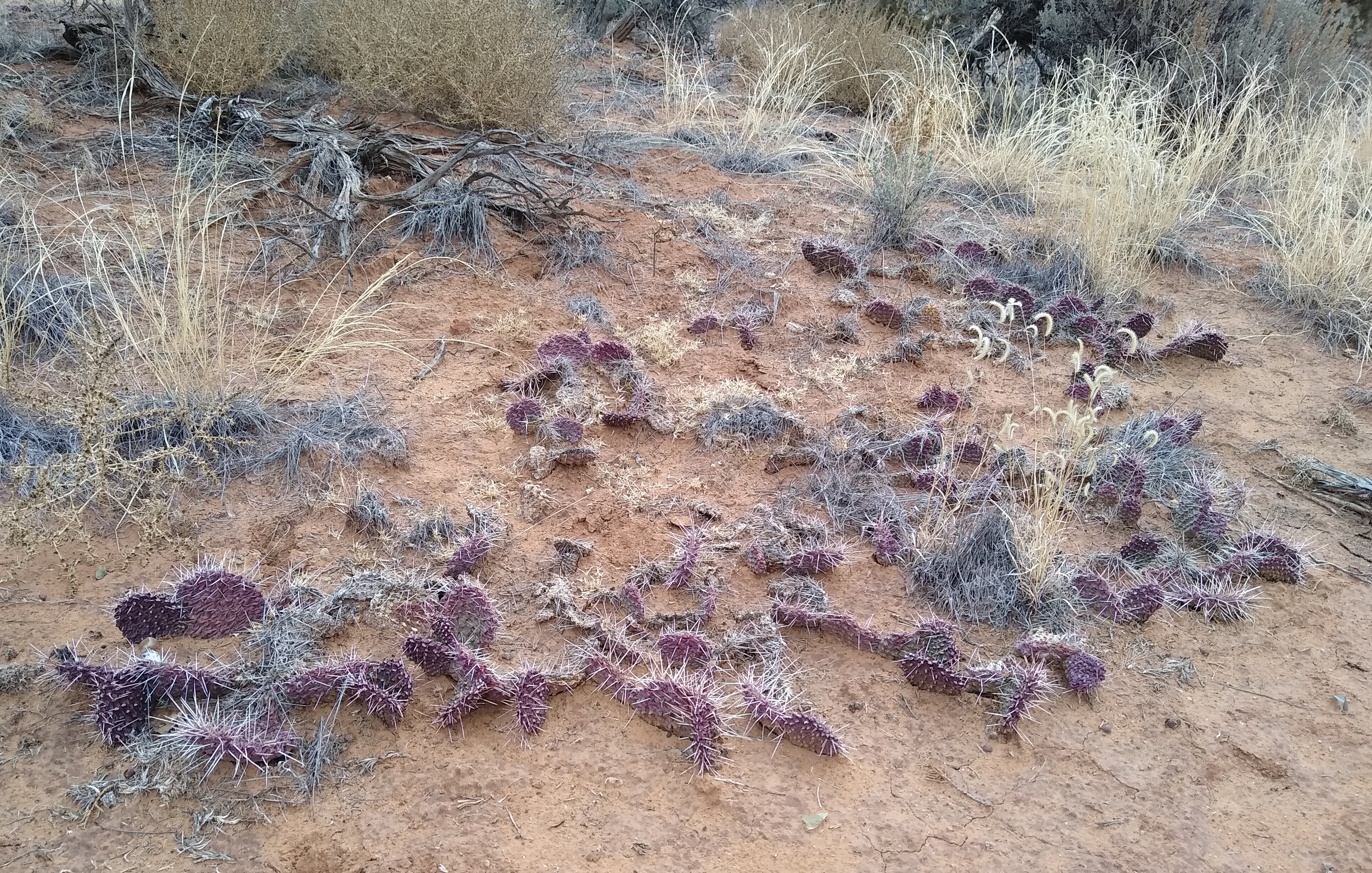
Plains pricklypear in Hawkins Preserve

Hawkins Preserve is a natural museum on 120 acres including seven ecological zones:

- Piñon-juniper woodland or Pygmy forest
- Sagebrush steppe
- Slickrock Pothole
- Rimrock
- Alluvial bottomland
- Riparian corridor and intermittent streams
- Post-disturbance and dunes

== History ==
=== Early people ===
Hunter-gather 8,000 B.P. to AD 1

Evidence from the Hovenweep National Monument, west of Cortez, indicates that there were Paleo-Indians hunter-gatherer and people of the Archaic period as early as 8,000 years ago. The ancestors of the Mesa Verde Pueblo people hunted and lived in a difficult terrain, traversed deep canyons and areas of few animals and limited vegetation, and managed limited access to water - which made life difficult and limited the size of their hunt groups. They gathered seeds and fruit from wild plants to supplement their diet.

Basket Makers AD 1 to 550

The people living in the Four Corners region were introduced to maize and basketry through Mesoamerican trading about 2,000 years Before Present Able to have greater control of their diet through cultivation, the hunter-gatherers lifestyle became more sedentary as small disperse groups began cultivating maize and squash. They also continued to hunt and gather wild plants.

They were named "Basket Makers" for their skill in making baskets for storing food, covering with pitch to heat water, and using to toast seeds and nuts. They wove bags, sandals, belts out of yucca plants and leaves - and strung beads. They occasionally lived in dry caves where they dug pits that they lined with stones to store food. These people were ancestors of the pueblo people of the Hovenweep pueblo settlement and Mesa Verde.

=== Hawkins Preserve residents ===
Modified Basket Makers 550 to 750

This era resulted in the introduction of pottery which reduced the number of baskets that they made and eliminated the creation of woven bags. The simple, gray pottery allowed them a better tool for cooking and storage. Beans were added to the cultivated diet. Bows and arrows made hunting easier and thus the acquisition of hides for clothing. Turkey feathers were woven into blankets and robes.

Developmental Pueblo 750 to 1100

Pueblo buildings were built with stone, windows facing south, and in U, E and L shapes. The buildings were located more closely together and reflected deepening religious celebration. Towers were built near kivas and likely used for look-outs. Pottery became more versatile, including pitchers, ladles, bowls, jars and dishware for food and drink. White pottery with black designs emerged, the pigments coming from plants. Water management and conservation techniques, including the use of reservoirs and silt-retaining dams also emerged during this period.

Like the people at Hovenweep National Monument, Canyon de Chelly National Monument, and the Mesa Verde village communities moved from mesa tops to the heads of canyons about 1100.

Great Pueblo period 1100 to 1300

People, generally considered part of the Mesa Verde branch of the northern San Juan Pueblo (Anasazi) culture, transitioned from their disperse housing and began building pueblos in the late 12th century alongside springs or other water sources near or at the canyon heads. Most of the pueblo building was conducted, about the same time as the Mesa Verde cliff dwellings, between 1230 and 1275 when there were about 2,500 residents. The Hovenweep architecture and pottery was like that of Mesa Verde.

About 1160, area residents, such as those at Mesa Verde and Hovenweep, began building larger pueblo residential complexes, up to 3 story towers, dams, and reservoirs. They moved their fields into areas where water could be controlled. They also built large stone towers, living quarters and other shelters to safeguard springs and seeps. The stone course pueblos and towers exhibit expert masonry skills and engineering. The builders did not level foundations for their structures, but adapted construction designs to the uneven surfaces of rock slabs. These stone pueblos were referred to as castles by 19th-century explorers.

=== Post-Pueblo Native American tribes 1300 to 1700 ===
After 1300 hunter-gatherers, ancestors of the Ute and Navajo, moved into the southwestern Colorado and southeastern Utah and came to inhabit the region.

- The ancestors to the Navajo were one of the tribes of the southern division of the Athabaskan language family that migrated south from Alaska and northwestern Canada, most likely traveling through the Great Basin. The Navajo ancestors were in the area after 1300, but at least by the early 16th century.
- The people from who the Ute descended arrived in the area from the west in this period from 1300 to the 18th century. The Ute's ancestors are hunter-gatherers who in the 12th century began migrating east from the present southern California area into a large hunter-gathering territory as far east as the Great Plains and in the canyons and mountains of eastern Utah and Colorado.

During this period, the Spanish colonial reach extended to northern New Mexico, where they settled in the 16th century. They introduced items for trade, such as guns and horses, new and deadly diseases, and cultural influence in the forms of religion, language, and forms of government. In the 18th century Spanish missionaries visited the area looking for a route to Spanish missions in California. One of the expeditions was that of Spanish friars Silvestre Vélez de Escalante and Francisco Atanasio Domínguez who traveled from New Mexico, through western Colorado to Utah.

=== European and American settlement 18th century to present ===
The first Anglo American people arrived in the early 1800s, starting with trappers. With the discovery of precious ores in the last decades of the 19th Century, miners and other settlers moved into the region.

The Hawkins Preserve includes land that was near a ranch owned by Henry Mitchell. On his land is an archaeological site of 9 medium-sized pueblos called "Mitchell Springs".

By the mid-19th century the United States government and Native American tribes were at war over land ownership. People were forced to leave their homelands. The Navajo had moved south and the Ute territory was significantly reduced.

=== Notable sites ===
Ruins site	Time period	Comments
Hawkins Pueblo	900 - 1250	Hawkins Pueblo, occupied by several related groups, is the largest ruin within the preserve. It was most populated in the Pueblo II period, from about 1000 to 1150. The site contains several room block ruins and rubble that contains a kiva, mounds, and middens.
Cliff dwellings	Possibly pre-historic period, historic period	Several small cliff dwellings were found along McElmo Canyon, about 1 mile from the Mitchell ranch in 1878. The stone constructed dwellings had several small rooms and a nearby corral, likely for sheep or cattle. The site was occupied by European settlers and may have been built and occupied earlier.

== Excavations ==
=== Lewis Henry Morgan ===
Lewis H. Morgan visited Montezuma Valley in 1878 during one of his trips through the American Southwest. At that time he made notes and maps of archaeological sites at the current Hawkins Preserve and nearby Mitchell Springs. Within the Hawkins Preserve he recorded cliff dwellings found along McElmo Canyon. The site included groups of several small chambers just above the canyon bottom. Nearby is a corral that held cattle, sheep or other livestock. It was clearly occupied some time after European American settlement, and possibly before then. The Mitchell Springs site, near Hawkins Preserve, consists of 9 medium-sized pueblos and believed to have occupied up to 1,000 people at its height. The site shows occupancy from the Basket Makers II period through late Pueblo III period.

=== J.A. Halasi ===
In 1977 J.A. Halasi conducted an archaeological inventory and identified 2 prehistoric scatters and a large pre-historic ruin. The large ruin was a rubble mound partially excavated to determine that were 2 kiva depressions, diagnostic pot sherds and midden deposits. The site seemed to be from the Pueblo II period.

=== Bruce Bradley ===
Bruce Bradley identified an additional 21 sites during an archaeological survey in 2000. The sites are from the Basket Maker II, Pueblo II, Pueblo II periods and unknown pueblo and pre-historic periods. In addition to dwellings, there were also an alcove room with pictographs, 3 check dams, a field house, grinding areas, hearths, and artifacts.

=== Mona C. Charles ===
Mona Charles led a group of Fort Lewis College students through an archaeological study in 2006. During that time they completed:

- Limited, low-disruption excavation to collect artifacts, which were sent to Crow Canyon Archaeological Center for analysis
- Electric resistivity and magnetometry technology surveys to identify ruins below the surface
- Total station and Global Positioning System (GPS) maps

=== State Historic Fund Grant ===
In 2006 a State Historic Fund Grant administered by the Colorado Historical Society was provided to study the main site in Hawkins Preserve.

== See also ==
Other neighboring Ancient Pueblo sites in Colorado

- Anasazi Heritage Center
- Canyons of the Ancients National Monument
- Crow Canyon Archaeological Center
- Hovenweep National Monument
- Mesa Verde National Park
- Yucca House National Monument

Other cultures in the Four Corners region

- Trail of the Ancients
- List of ancient dwellings of Pueblo peoples

Early American cultures

- List of prehistoric sites in Colorado
- Ancestral Puebloans
- Oasisamerica cultures
- Paleo-Indians
