= Canyons of the Ancients National Monument =

Monument protecting significant sites of ancient Native Americans

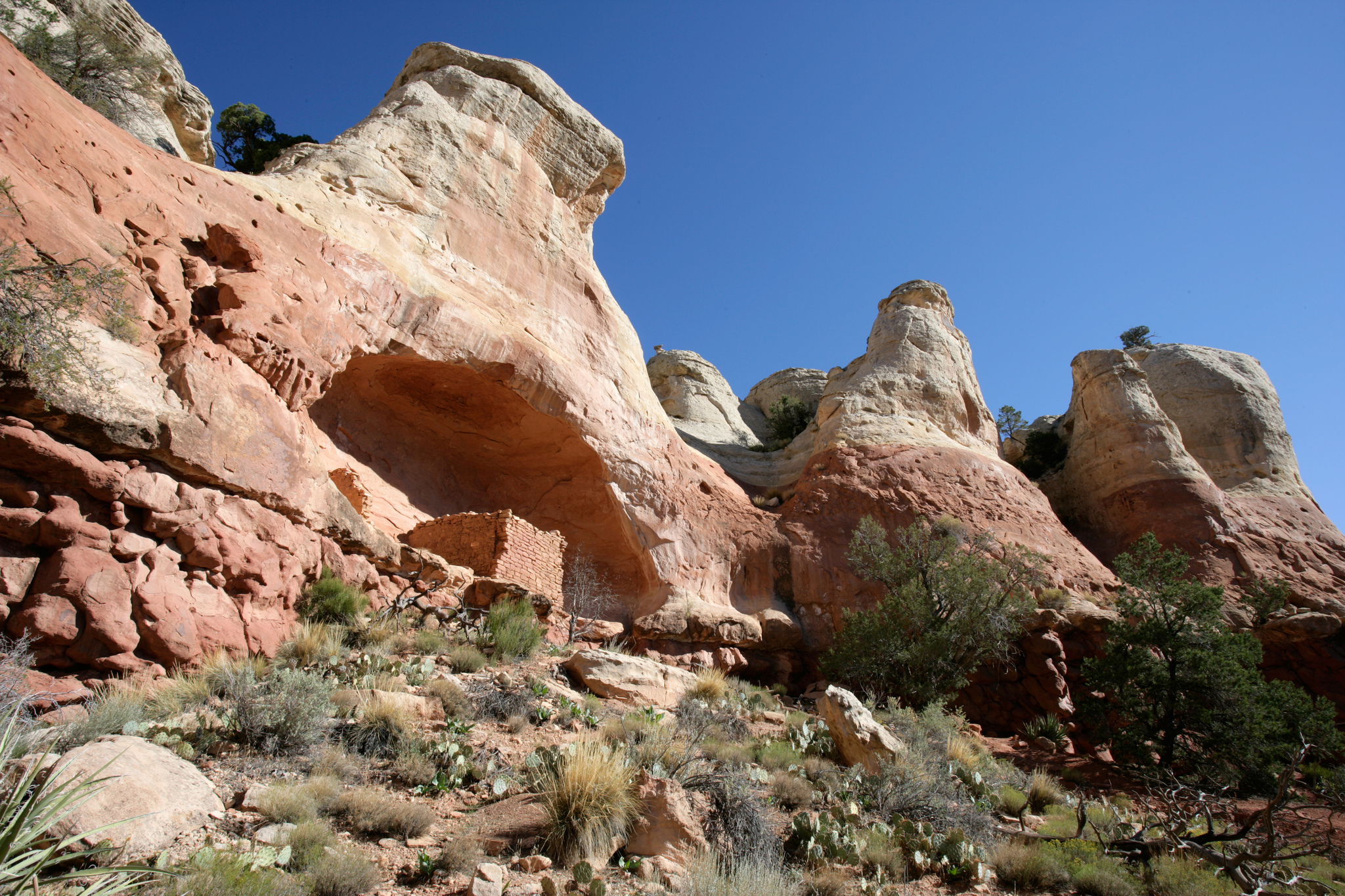

- Location within Colorado Location within the United States
- Interactive map of Canyons of the Ancients National Monument
- Location: Montezuma and Dolores counties, Colorado, United States
- Nearest city: Cortez, CO
- Coordinates: 37.370556°N 109°W
- Area: 176,056 acres (71,247 ha)
- Established: June 9, 2000
- Governing body: U.S. Bureau of Land Management
- Website: Canyons of the Ancients National Monument

Canyons of the Ancients National Monument is a national monument protecting an archaeologically significant landscape located in the southwestern region of the U.S. state of Colorado. The monument's 176,056 acres (712.47 km^{2}) are managed by the Bureau of Land Management, as directed in the presidential proclamation which created the site on June 9, 2000. Canyons of the Ancients National Monument is part of the National Landscape Conservation System, better known as the National Conservation Lands. This system comprises 32,000,000 acres (130,000 km^{2}) managed by the Bureau of Land Management to conserve, protect, and restore these nationally significant landscapes recognized for their outstanding cultural, ecological, and scientific values. Canyons of the Ancients encompasses and surrounds three of the four separate sections of Hovenweep National Monument, which is administered by the National Park Service. The monument was proclaimed in order to preserve the largest concentration of archaeological sites in the United States, primarily Ancestral Puebloan ruins. As of 2022, over 8,500 individual archeological sites had been documented within the monument.

== Geography ==
Canyons of the Ancients National Monument is located 9 miles (14 km) west of Pleasant View, Colorado in southwestern Colorado. (Note: There are several references that Lowry Pueblo is 9 miles west of Mesa Verde National Park, which is partially true: it's 9 miles west of Mesa Verde's western edge, but it's Mesa Verde is at least as far further south. The more correct statement from Gregory is that Lowry Pueblo is 9 miles west of Pleasant View, Colorado.) The monument's northern and eastern boundaries are canyons. Its western boundary is the Colorado-Utah state border and the reservation of the Navajo Nation. Lands south are bordered by the Ute Mountain Reservation and McElmo Creek.

== History ==
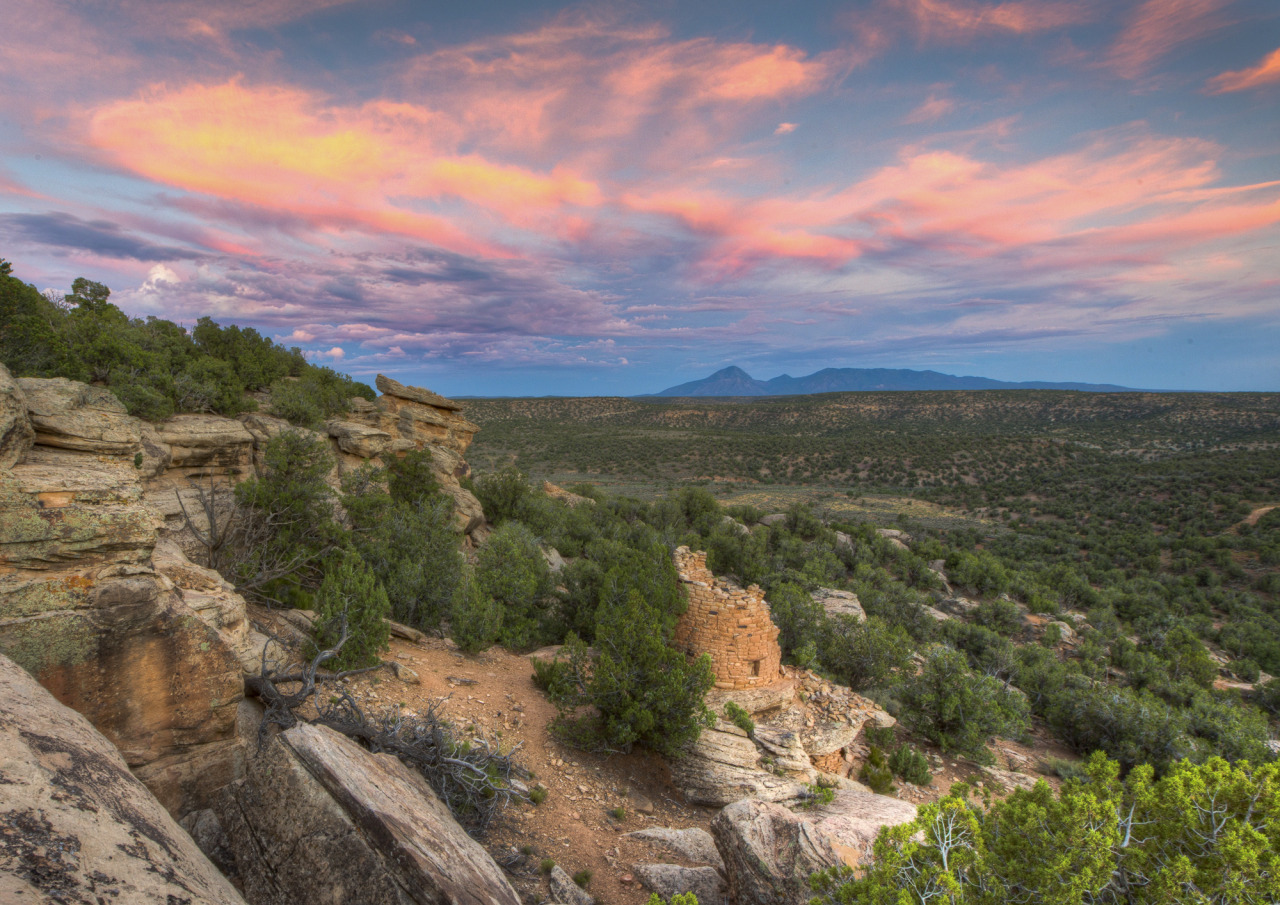
Painted Hand Pueblo, Great Pueblo period: AD 1100 to 1300

=== Canyons of the Ancients residents ===
==== Developmental Pueblo: AD 500 to 1100 ====
Ancient Pueblo people lived in the Canyons of the Ancients in the 10th century; Lowry Pueblo, built during the Great Pueblo period, was built atop pit-house built in the 10th century.

For a fuller understanding of the architecture and life style during this period, pueblo buildings in the Mesa Verde region were built with stone, windows facing south, and in U, E and L shapes. The buildings were located more closely together and reflected deepening religious celebration. Towers were built near kivas and likely used for look-outs. Pottery became more versatile, including pitchers, ladles, bowls, jars and tableware for food and drink. White pottery with black designs emerged, the pigments coming from plants. Water management and conservation techniques, including the use of reservoirs and silt-retaining dams also emerged during this period.

==== Great Pueblo period: AD 1100 to 1300 ====
As refinements in construction techniques increased, the Puebloans built larger pueblos, or villages, on top of the pit-houses starting about AD 1090. Lowry Pueblo had just a few rooms and 2 kivas in 1090 and the village was expanded two times about 1103 and 1120 until it had 40 rooms, 8 kivas and one great kiva.

Like their ancient neighbors at Hovenweep National Monument and Mesa Verde National Park, the Lowry Pueblo dwellers were farmers and hunters. They grew beans, corn and squash and raised turkeys. They also made and decorated pottery.

==== Notable sites ====
At least 8,500 distinct structures have been identified in the monument, and the density of archeological remains is the highest of any region in the United States. The vast majority of stone structures in the national monument are from the Ancient Puebloans era.

More than 30,000 sites likely exist in the Monument, in some places more than 200 sites per square mile. After building basic pit style structures at first, the Puebloans later built villages with cliff dwellings. Archaeological ruins also include Sweat lodges, kivas, shrines and petroglyphs. Reservoirs with stone and earthen dams, including spillways and also numerous check dams, built in case of flash floods. Stone towers which may have been lookout or sentry posts, are found scattered throughout the monument.

Pueblo	Photo	Comments
Lowry Pueblo		The Lowry Pueblo National Historic Landmark consists of 8 kivas, a great (community) kiva and 40 rooms built as high as three stories. The underground great kiva was built about 1090 AD and had murals painted over about 5 layers of plaster. About 1110 AD, another kiva was built on top of the original kiva. Based upon the size of the kiva it's thought that the Lowry Pueblo may have been a local center for religious gatherings and celebration.
Painted Hand Pueblo		The Painted Hand Pueblo is a backcountry site that consists of non-excavated ruins built upon boulders along a cliff-face and a standing tower. The pueblo received its name from a boulder with pictographs of hands.
Sand Canyon Pueblo		One of the largest pueblos of the 13th century, Sand Canyon Pueblo, built between 1250 and 1280, contains at least 20 multi-family room blocks with 420 rooms, 90 kivas, and 14 towers. A spring runs through the center of the walled site that held up to 725 people. Construction was exacting, with care taken to shape stone, and some double and triple walls for stability. Families lived in clusters of rooms that included living, storage and work rooms and had their own family kivas. The community shared roofed plazas and great kivas, and towers often connected to kivas. By 1280, new construction had stopped and people began migrating out of the pueblo.

==== Migration ====
Unlike other Ancient Pueblo site abandonment, it appears that the people of the Canyons of the Ancients left the sites much earlier than their neighbors, some time in the mid-12th century. Some of the artifacts found from the site show a connection to the Chacoan culture, while others are similar to those of the Mesa Verde dwellers.

Other Ancient Pueblo people from the area migrated south to Arizona and New Mexico, ancestors to modern pueblo people such as the Hopi and Zuni. Modern Pueblo people are located on reservations primarily in New Mexico, but some in Arizona. The 60,000 people's pueblos and reservations reside in three geographic areas:

- along the upper Rio Grande in New Mexico, such as Taos Pueblo
- southern New Mexican Zuni, Acoma, Laguna and Isleta pueblos and reservations
- Arizona Hopi.

=== Post-Pueblo Native American tribes: 14th to 18th century ===
After 1300, hunter-gatherers, ancestors of the Ute and Navajo, moved into the southwestern Colorado and southeastern Utah and came to inhabit the region.

- The ancestors to the Navajo were one of the tribes of the southern division of the Athabaskan language family that migrated south from Alaska and northwestern Canada, most likely traveling through the Great Basin. The Navajo ancestors were in the area after AD 1300, but at least by the early 16th century.
- The people from who the Ute descended arrived in the area from the west in this period from 1300 to the 18th century. The Ute's ancestors are hunter-gatherers who, in the 12th century, began migrating east from the present southern California area into a large hunter-gathering territory as far east as the Great Plains and in the canyons and mountains of eastern Utah and Colorado.

During this period, the Spanish colonial reach extended to northern New Mexico, where they settled in the 16th century. They introduced items for trade, such as guns and horses, new and deadly diseases, and cultural influence in the forms of religion, language, and forms of government. In the 18th century, Spanish missionaries visited the area looking for a route to Spanish missions in California. One of the expeditions was that of Spanish friars Silvestre Vélez de Escalante and Francisco Atanasio Domínguez who traveled from New Mexico, through western Colorado to Utah.

=== European and American settlement: 19th century to present ===
The first Anglo American people arrived in the early 19th century, starting with trappers. With the discovery of precious ores in the last decades of the 19th century, miners and other settlers moved into the region. By the mid-19th century, the United States government and Native American tribes were at war over land ownership. People were forced to leave their homelands. The Navajo had moved south and the Ute territory was significantly reduced.

== Excavation and restoration ==
Lowry Pueblo was excavated between 1930 and 1934 by Paul S. Martin of the Field Museum of Natural History and went through a restoration process in 1965. Two years later, it was named a National Historic Landmark and was listed on the National Register of Historic places.

== National monument ==
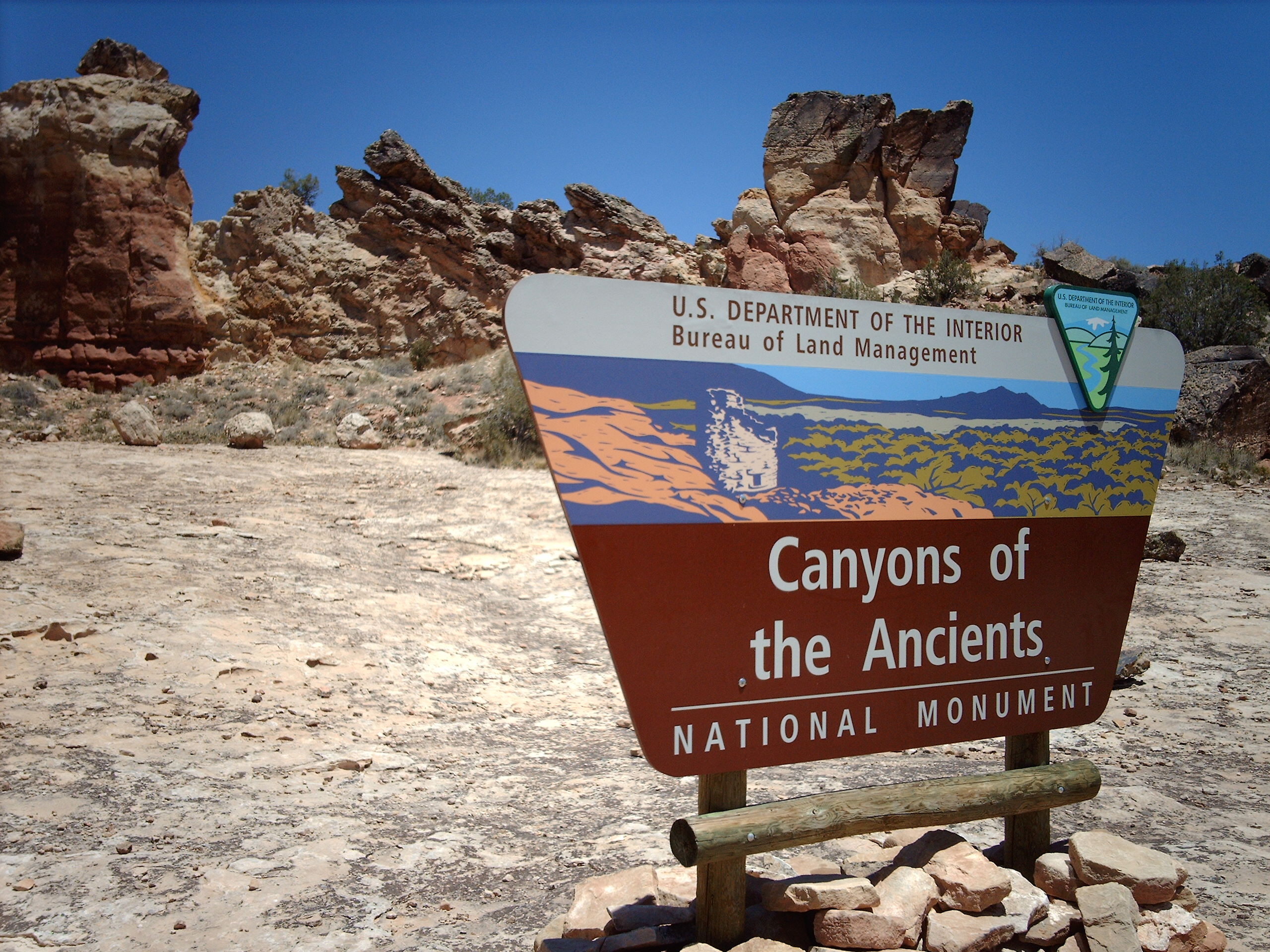
Entrance sign for the monument, with a rock formation

=== Canyons of the Ancients National Monument ===
The U.S. Bureau of Land Management administers the monument and enforces regulations balancing resource protection with land conservation. It was created by executive proclamation in 2000 with the intention of protecting the archaeological, natural and geological resources. Facilities at the Lowry Pueblo include parking, a picnic area, toilet and trail. Sand Canyon Pueblo also has a trail, which leads to McElmo Canyon.

While other national monuments in the Southwest, including Hovenweep, were limited to the area around major ruins, "Canyons of the Ancients was perhaps the first to explicitly recognize that ruins do not tell the entire story—that ancients lived in, hunted, gathered and raised crops, and developed water and religious sites throughout the larger landscape,” according to Secretary of the Interior Bruce Babbitt.

=== Wilderness study areas ===
There are three Wilderness study areas in the monument:

- Cahone Canyon, located about 4 mi (6 km) southwest of the town of Cahone, Colorado, is about 9,156 acres (3,705 ha). The wilderness area, varying from 5,900 to 6,000 feet (1,798 to 1,829 m) in elevation, consists of three canyons with piñon-juniper woodlands and riparian and sagebrush ecosystems.
- Cross Canyon, located south of Cahone Canyon, about 14 mi (23 km) southwest of the town of Cahone, Colorado, is about 12,721 acres (5,148 ha), 1,008 acres (408 ha) cross into Utah. The wilderness area, varying from 5,140 to 6,500 feet (1,570 to 1,980 m) in elevation, consists of three canyons (Cross, Ruin, and Cow), with piñon-juniper woodlands and riparian and sagebrush ecosystems.
- Squaw/Papoose Canyon is located about 12 mi (19 km) south of Dove Creek and is about 11,357 acres (4,596 ha), 6,676 acres (2,702 ha) cross into Utah. The wilderness area, varying from 5,300 to 6,600 feet (1,600 to 2,000 m) in elevation, consists of two canyons (Squaw and Papoose).

=== Anasazi Heritage Center and Canyons of the Ancients visitor center ===
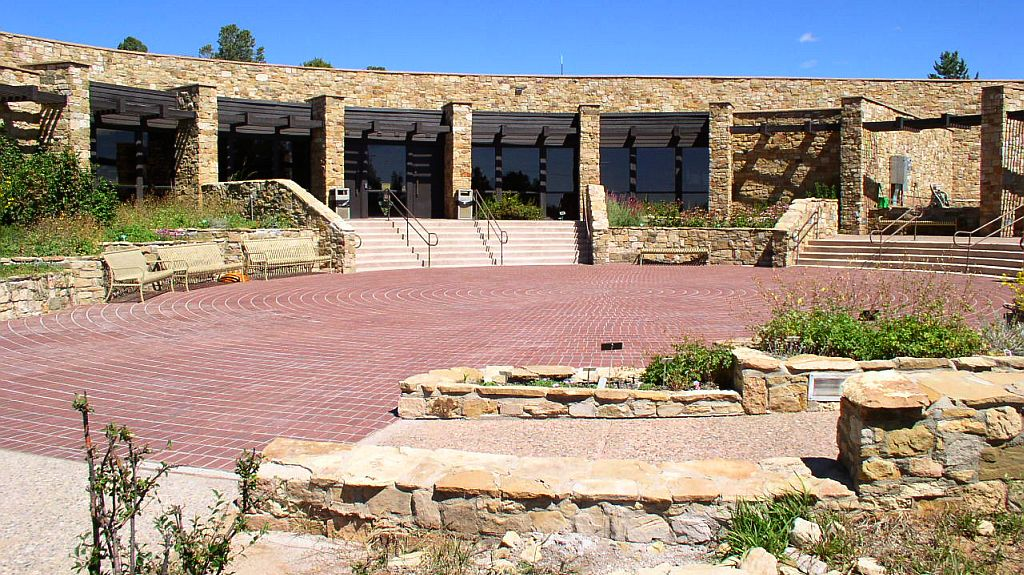
The Canyons of the Ancients Visitor Center and Museum

The Canyons of the Ancients Visitor Center and Museum, formerly known as the Anasazi Heritage Center, includes artifacts from the monument, a museum with interactive exhibits, a library and a theatre. Information is available there regarding the Ancient Puebloan culture, Trail of the Ancients Byway and the Canyons of the Ancients National Monument.

=== Vandalism ===
Vandalism and treasure hunting are difficult to minimize due to an inadequate number of federal employees and law enforcement personnel to monitor and prosecute those who deface ruins or steal archeological remains. Thousands of undocumented artifacts have been removed from the monument and now reside in private collections. A news article in July 2006 reported that funding for the monument had decreased by almost 40% since 2004, and that a particularly severe looting episode occurred in January 2006.

== Natural resources ==
=== Geology and topography ===
The northern part of the Monument in part has gently sloping, relatively even surfaces ranging in elevation from about 6,700 feet (2,000 m) in the east to about 6,000 to 5,500 feet (1,800 to 1,700 m) in the west. These surfaces are upheld by sedimentary rocks of Cretaceous age that are mostly covered by much younger gravel and sand layers deposited in the last several million years. The region is incised by canyons that drain south and west to McElmo Creek; the creek falls from the east at about 5,800 to 4,800 feet (1,800 to 1,500 m) west at the Utah border. The oldest rocks are exposed in McElmo Canyon and are sedimentary layers of Jurassic age. In and near the Monument, these sedimentary rocks have been bent upwards to form a dome, the McElmo Dome: most of the Jurassic rocks are below the surface in the regions immediately bordering the area. The southern boundary of much of the Monument lies just north of McElmo Creek. The Ute Mountains to the south are cored by igneous intrusions and rise to 9,979 feet (3,042 m).

==== Formations from the Cretaceous and Jurassic periods ====
The following description of the geology of the Monument is derived mostly from contributions to Anderson et al. (1997), unless otherwise referenced. The nomenclature of the rock units here may not represent the present consensus. The sedimentary sequence is over 1,500 feet (460 m) thick and is represented by the stratigraphic units listed below.

Geological period	Formation	Rock	Approx. Depth	Comments
Cretaceous (145.5–66 million years ago)	Dakota Sandstone	Mostly sandstone, locally with conglomerate and thin beds of shale and coal.	100 feet (30 m)	It was deposited during the Cretaceous Period (about 95 million years ago). Flaked tools have been made from chert clasts extracted from the conglomerate (Gerhardt et al.).
Cretaceous (145.5–66 million years ago)	Burro Canyon Formation	Mostly sandstone, siltstone, and mudstone, formed from river deposits, and it is similar to the Dakota Sandstone but lacks coal beds.	100 feet (30 m), but highly variable.	Silicified sandstone in this unit has been used to make flaked tools (Gerhardt et al.).
Jurassic (199.6–145.5 million years ago)	Morrison Formation	The Morrison Formation is made mostly of siltstone and sandstone formed from river and lake deposits. Some layers are made from volcanic ash. Parts of this ash altered to zeolites and chalcedony have been used to make flaked tools. (Gerhardt et al.).	600 feet (180 m)	Elsewhere in the Morrison Formation, many fossils of large dinosaurs have been found, as have deposits of uranium and vanadium.
Jurassic (199.6–145.5 million years ago)	Bluff Sandstone (also called Junction Creek Sandstone)	In part it formed from a great deposit of windblown sand (an erg).	250 feet (76 m)	Elsewhere well-preserved dinosaur tracks have been found in rocks of this unit.
Jurassic (199.6–145.5 million years ago)	Summerville Formation (also called Wanakah Formation)	Mostly siltstone and sandstone.	100 feet (30 m)	
Jurassic (199.6–145.5 million years ago)	Entrada Sandstone	Consists of about 30 feet of red siltstone that commonly weathers to a knobby surface, overlain by about 80 feet of sandstone.	110 feet (34 m)	Cliff dwellings and other structures are common in alcoves in this sandstone.
Jurassic (199.6–145.5 million years ago)	Navajo Sandstone	Formed from wind-blown sand.	100 feet (30 m)	The trail head at Sand Canyon near McElmo Creek is on rocks of this unit.
Jurassic (199.6–145.5 million years ago)	Kayenta Formation	Sandstone formed from stream deposits.	20 to 30 feet (6 to 9 m)	
Jurassic (199.6–145.5 million years ago)	Wingate Sandstone	Formed from wind-blown sand.	At least 170 feet (50 m)	It was deposited about 190 million years ago.

==== Carboniferous Period ====
Carbon dioxide is produced from rocks of Mississippian age (Carboniferous Period 359.2–299 million years ago) in the McElmo Dome, from wells drilled to a depth of about 8,000 feet (2,400 m). The dome contains one of the largest deposits of carbon dioxide in the United States, and the extracted gas is used for enhanced oil recovery. This carbon dioxide reservoir has been studied to learn about possible underground storage (carbon sequestration) of carbon dioxide.

=== Oil and gas exploration ===
In 1986, the area was designated as the Anasazi Area of Critical Environmental Concern by the Bureau of Land Management to ensure there are no new leases for oil and gas industry; Leases will only be given to promote the conservation of oil and gas resources.

85% of the monument was under lease by ranchers and oil and gas exploration entities in 2000. With only 2,000 acres (800 ha) of monument land that is not leased, and that land home to ancient archaeological sites and wildlife habitat, four environmental groups have been active to ensure there is no further oil and gas exploration and extraction. However, off-road vehicles and an increase in road construction for oil and gas exploration, allow greater access to archeological areas. Large trucks known as "thumpers" were found searching for oil and gas pockets by pounding the earth and recording the seismic data, having received a green light from the Bureau of Land Management. Executive Director of the San Juan Citizens Alliance, Mark Pearson stated:

The decision showed a blatant disregard for the proclamation [that states that leases should only be made to protect and preserve oil and gas resources]. That does not bode well for the future management for the rest of this monument or any monument in the country.

In 2006, the National Trust for Historic Preservation reported that the nation's push for energy resources on federal land is occurring at a cost of archaeological and cultural resources at Canyons of the Ancients National Monument and Utah's Nine Mile Canyon. The National Trust further asserted that the Bureau of Land Management has only documented 17,000,000 acres (69,000 km^{2}) of the 262 under its stewardship.

Ken Salazar, Secretary of Interior, said in 2009:

With an emphasis on conservation, protection and restoration, the National Landscape Conservation System and Canyons of the Ancients National Monument represent a new era of management for the BLM. After 130 years of exploration and research identifying tens of thousands of irreplaceable and fragile archaeological sites, we know that Canyons of the Ancients represents the best of our cultural heritage. Using an army of volunteers who contribute on the ground services and applying the principles of balanced management and science-based decision-making, this crown jewel preserves ancestral homes and landscapes for Native American citizens and for children and communities throughout the United States.

=== Wildlife ===
The Monument is home to a wide variety of desert wildlife, some of which are the American kestrels, Gambel's quail, Golden eagles, Long-Nosed Leopard lizard, Mesa Verde nightsnake, mourning dove, Peregrine falcons, Red-tailed hawks the Twin-spotted Spiny Lizard. Mammals that pass through the riparian and piñon-juniper woodland are jackrabbits, Mule deer, ringtail, fox, muskrat, beaver and bobcat.

Wildlife and plant habitat are threatened by increased road and building construction by oil and gas interests.

== Gallery ==
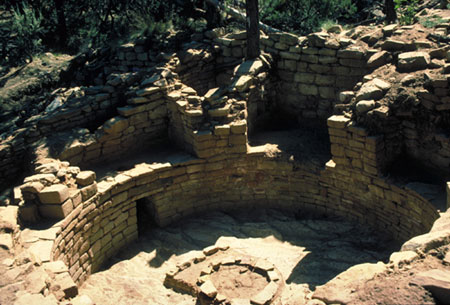
Kiva ruins

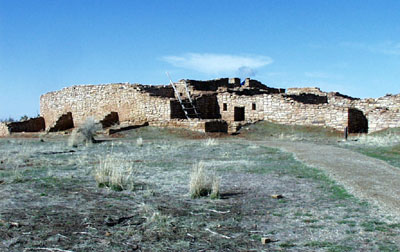
Lowry Pueblo

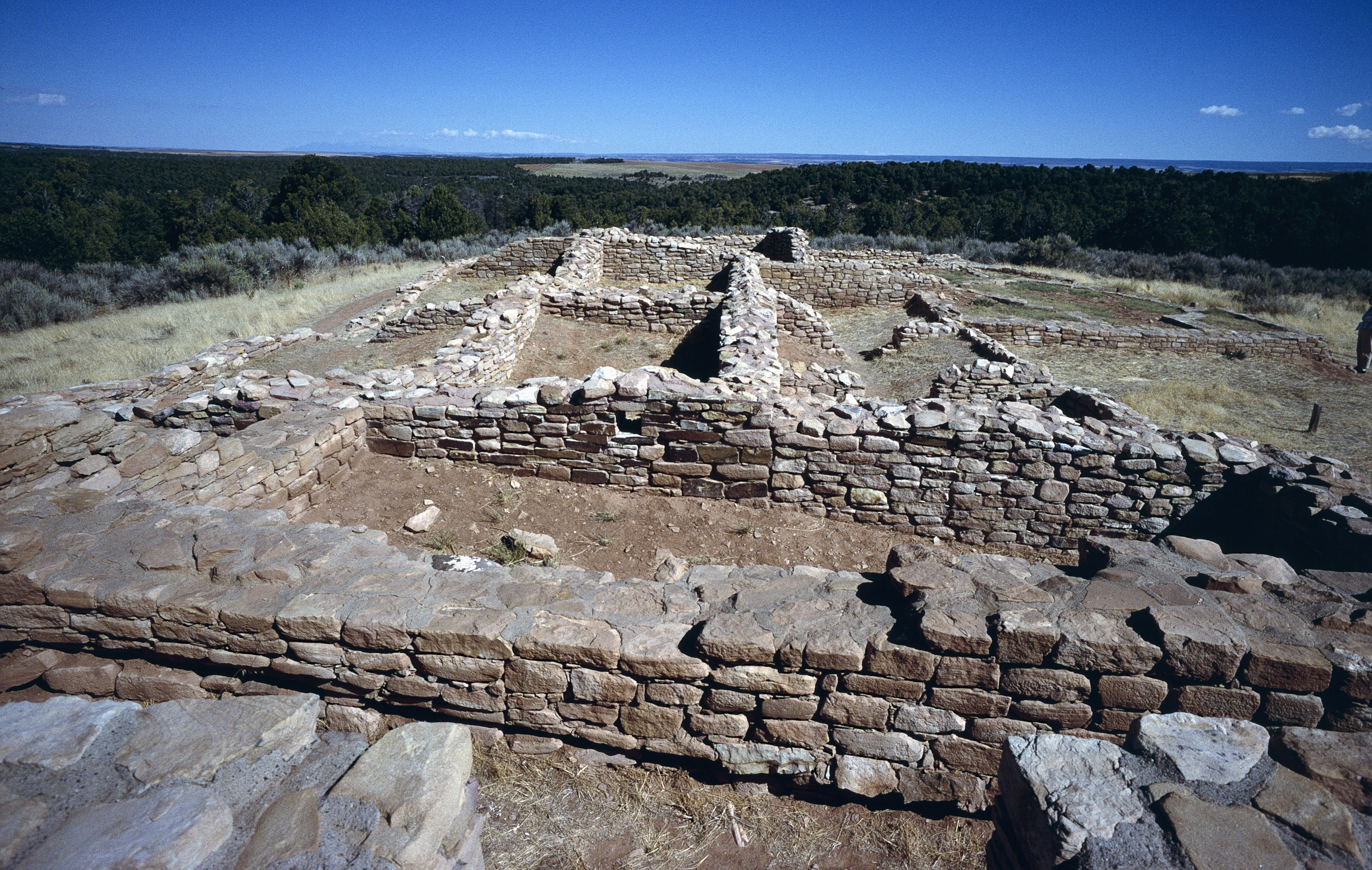
Lowry Pueblo

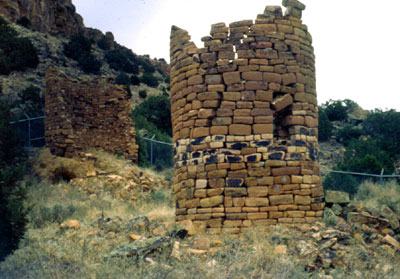
Stone towers are numerous in the monument

== See also ==
- List of national monuments of the United States

Other neighboring Ancient Pueblo sites in Colorado

- Anasazi Heritage Center
- Crow Canyon Archaeological Center
- Hovenweep National Monument
- Mesa Verde National Park

Other cultures in the Four Corners region

- Trail of the Ancients
- List of ancient dwellings of Pueblo peoples

Early cultures

- Ancestral Puebloans
- List of prehistoric sites in Colorado
- Oasisamerica cultures
- Outline of Colorado prehistory
- Paleo-Indians
