= Lowry Pueblo =

Archaeological site in Colorado, United States

- Lowry Ruin
- U.S. National Register of Historic Places
- U.S. National Historic Landmark
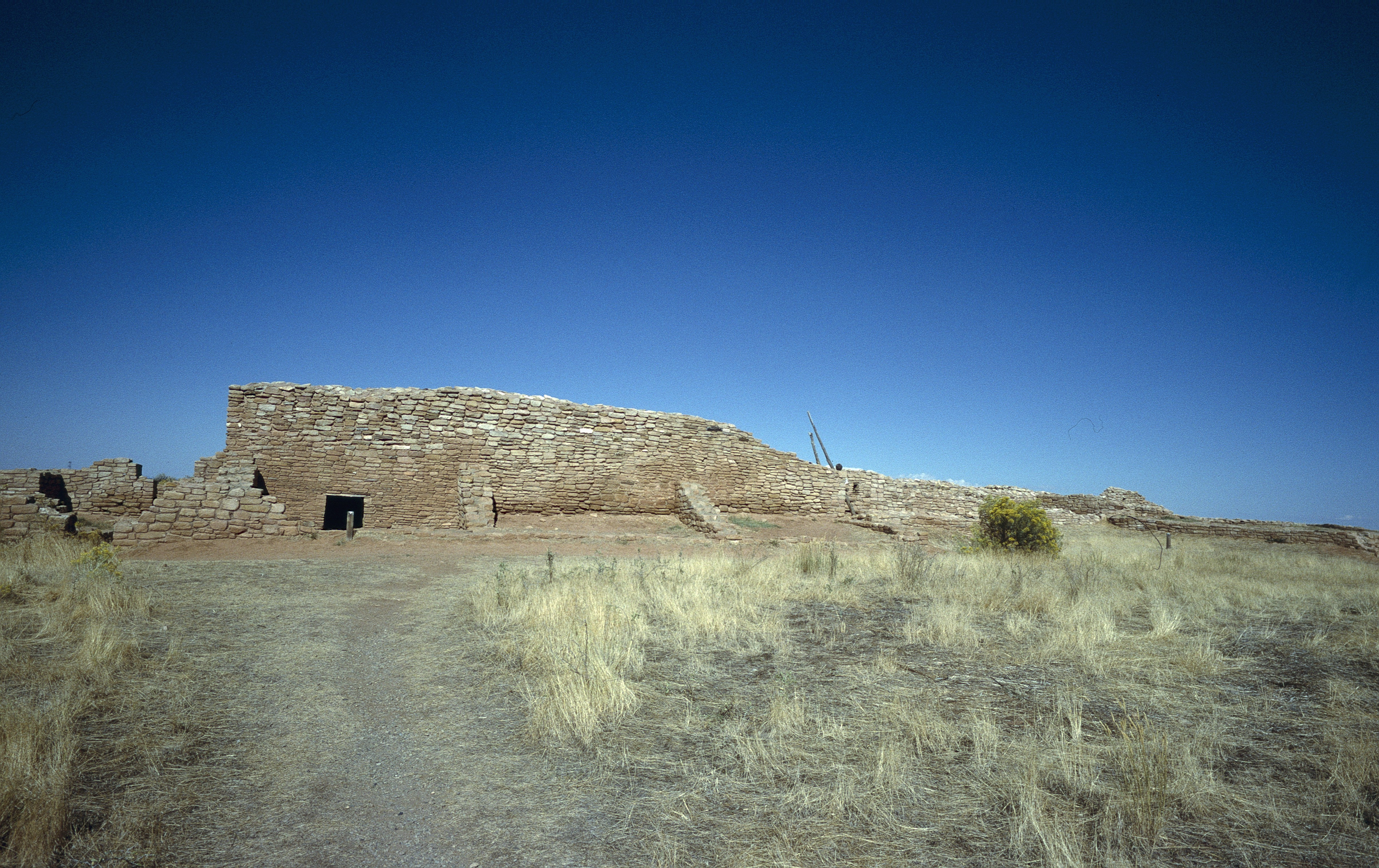
- Lowry Pueblo

- Location within Colorado Location within the United States
- Location: Montezuma County, Colorado, USA
- Nearest city: Pleasant View, Colorado
- Coordinates: 37.5845306°N 108.9196472°W
- Area: 3 acres (1.2 ha)
- NRHP reference No.: 66000253

Significant dates
- Added to NRHP: October 15, 1966
- Designated NHL: July 19, 1964

The Lowry Pueblo is an Ancestral Puebloan archaeological site located in Canyons of the Ancients National Monument near Pleasant View, Colorado, United States. The pueblo was constructed around 1060 AD atop abandoned pithouses from an earlier period of occupation. It was occupied by 40 to 100 people at a time for 165 years. The site is one of the northernmost to be associated with the Puebloan cultures. The site was declared a National Historic Landmark in 1964.

== Description ==
Lowry Pueblo is located about 45 miles (72 km) northwest of Cortez, Colorado, and about 100 miles (160 km) north of Chaco Canyon, one of the major centers of Ancestral Puebloan culture. The pueblo was named for the early area homesteader George Lowry. It is believed to have begun as a relative small community with just a few rooms, but is unusual for the presence of a great kiva, suggesting it served as a communal center for a scattered population before the settlement around it got larger. The inhabitants were farmers who also hunted small game, made elaborately decorated pottery, and wove cotton obtained by trade. Its last occupation occurred in the early 13th century.

Lowry Pueblo was first excavated during summer field seasons from 1930 to 1934 by Paul Sidney Martin of the Field Museum of Natural History in Chicago. In 1965, the Bureau of Land Management (BLM), which owned the property, undertook a two-year project with the University of Colorado to stabilize the ruins, which had become partially buried. It was incorporated as part of the Canyons of the Ancients National Monument in 2000.

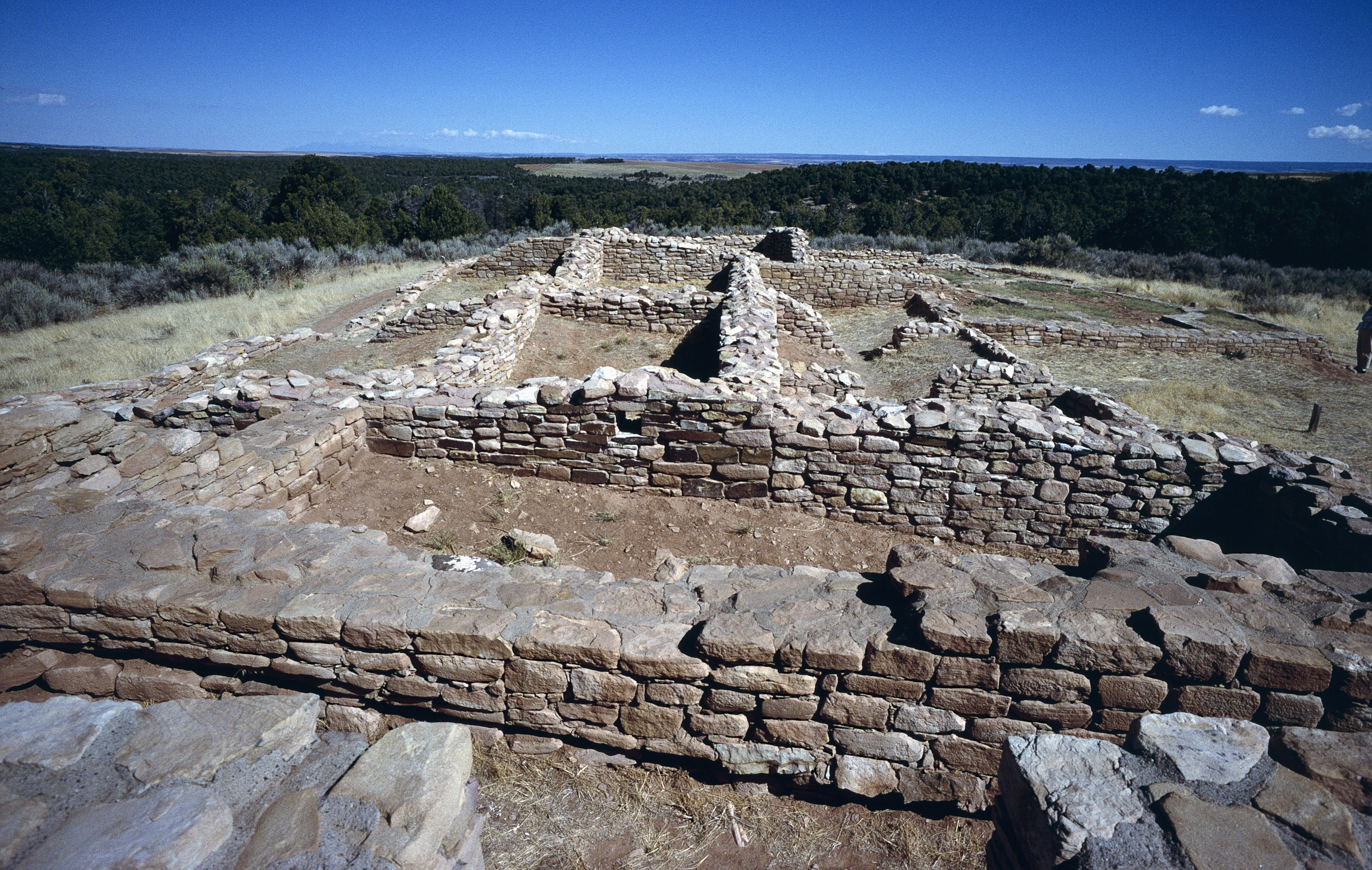
Lowry Pueblo

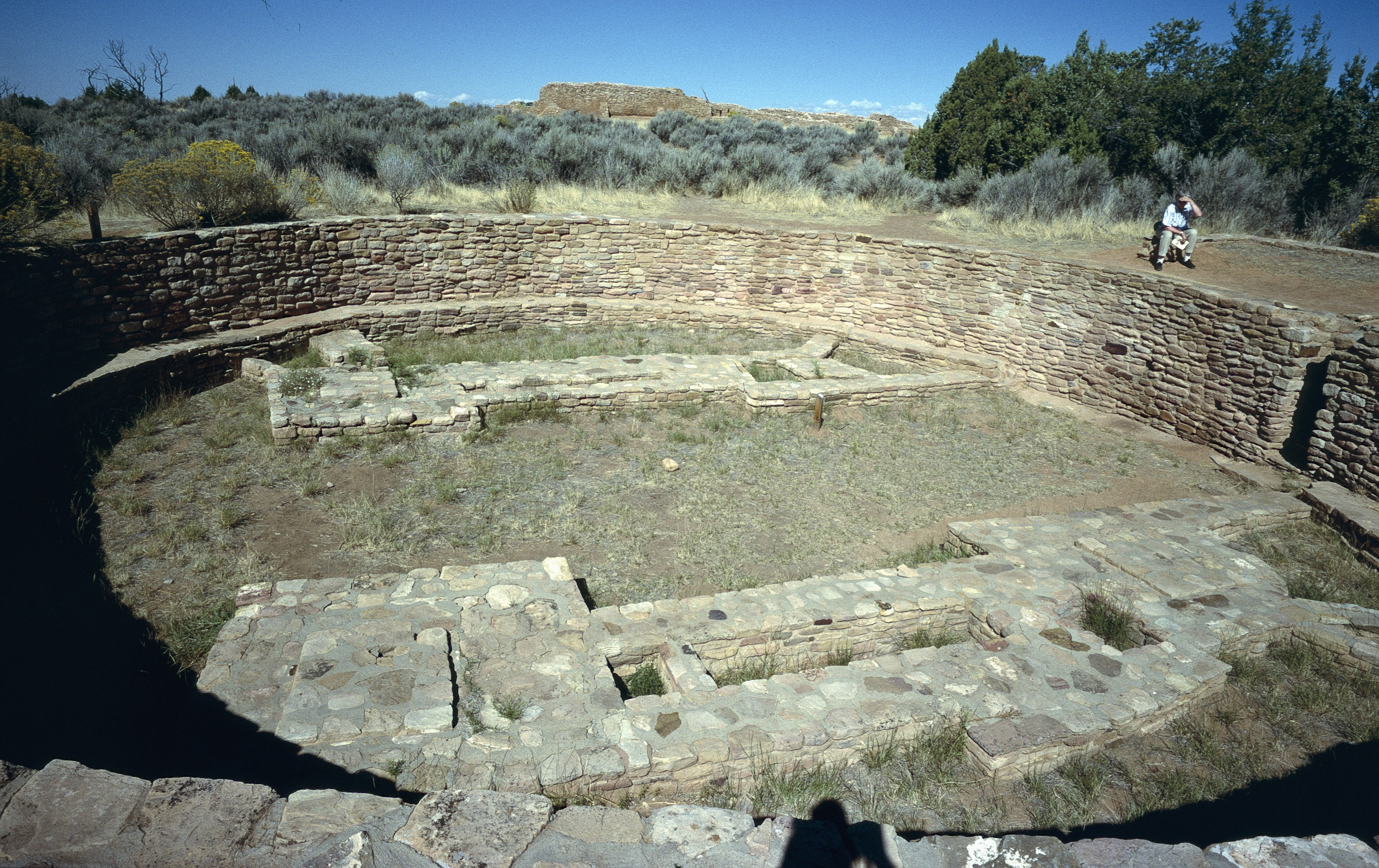
Great Kiva in Lowry Pueblo

== See also ==
- Ancestral Puebloans
- Anasazi Heritage Center
- Hovenweep National Monument
- List of National Historic Landmarks in Colorado
