= Paul Sidney Martin =

American anthropologist and archaeologist

- Born: November 22, 1898; Chicago, Illinois
- Died: January 20, 1974 (aged 75)
- Occupations: Anthropologist, archeologist

Paul Sidney Martin (born November 22, 1898 in Chicago – died January 20, 1974) was an American anthropologist and archaeologist. A lifelong associate of the Field Museum of Natural History in Chicago, Martin studied pre-Columbian cultures of the Southwestern United States. He excavated more than a hundred archaeological sites, starting with the groundbreaking seven-season expedition to the Montezuma County, Colorado in 1930–1938. His research passed through three distinct stages: field archaeology of the Anasazi Pueblo cultures of Colorado in the 1930s, studies of the Mogollon culture in 1939–1955 and the New Archaeology studies in 1956–1972. Martin collected more than 585 thousand archaeological artifacts although his own methods of handling these relics were at times destructive and unacceptable even by the standards of his time.

Martin was elected President of the Society for American Archaeology and awarded the 1968 Alfred Vincent Kidder Award of the American Anthropological Association. He trained over fifty professional archaeologists and published more than 200 academic and popular papers. Martin's field expeditions redefined the role of museum anthropologists from the search for exhibits to research-driven field studies.

== Biography ==
Martin was the fifth child of Ellsworth C. Martin and Adelaide May Martin (née Sackett). The most recent biographical article by Stephen Nash states his date of birth as November 22, 1898; the site of the Field Museum of Natural History as November 20, 1899. He attended the New Trier High School in Winnetka, Illinois. He studied history and languages at the University of Chicago from September 1918 to December 1923. Martin attained a modest B- average grade and found his true calling, anthropology, only in the end of his undergraduate studies. He began graduate studies at the Department of Sociology under Fay-Cooper Cole and became Cole's first Ph.D. student (he defended his Ph.D. thesis on Kiva culture in May 1929). In the summer of 1925 Martin departed for his first practical field excavations sponsored by the Milwaukee Public Museum.

In the summer of 1926 Martin examined 450 sites of the Mount Builders and 1,200 related artifacts in private collections. His first article has set a standard for the rest of his life: Martin the scientist was later known for prompt publication of collected field data. In the next three winters he assisted Sylvanus Morley in his Yucatán expeditions; in summers he attended excavations in Colorado. Martin seriously dedicated himself to Mesoamerican studies, but in 1929 his long-term plans were cut short by an acute bout of tropical diseases. The medics ruled out further field work in the jungle, and Martin had to limit his scientific career to continental United States.

By this time he was already well known to Midwestern historians and archaeologists. In 1928 Martin had already begun his ten-year research in Montezuma County, Colorado but in the summer of 1929 the Department of the Interior denied him permission to excavate Lowry Pueblo. The DOI argued that Martin's employer, the State Historical Society of Colorado, was financially unable to complete the excavation. According to Nash, this setback motivated Martin to seek a stronger employer. Indeed, on August 22, 1929 Berthold Laufer of the Field Museum of Natural History offered Martin a job at the museum's department of anthropology and Martin readily accepted the offer.

Nash wrote that the museum "almost certainly" planned to use Martin in the upcoming modernization of the museum exhibits in its new building in Grant Park. Martin "spent a remarkable amount of time" in rearranging the exhibition and public outreach campaigns that preceded and accompanied the Century of Progress exhibition of 1933–1934 and wrote the 122-page guide to the Archaeology of North America collection. After Laufer's suicide in 1934 Martin became the acting curator of the department and temporarily assumed Laufer's role in presenting the Oriental collections to the public. Martin chaired the department if from 1935 to 1964 and remained with the museum until 1972. According to Nash, "no other Field Museum curator, in anthropology or any other department, was as visible on the exhibition floor, in Field Museum News, or in the Chicago newspapers during" the pre-war period.

Martin was never married and had no children. Towards the end of his life, in 1972, Martin moved to Tucson, Arizona and for a short time worked at the University of Arizona. The university already employed another, and unrelated, Paul S. Martin (Paul Schultz Martin). This other Paul S. Martin (who died in 2010 and had already established himself as an unorthodox thinker, beginning in the 1960s) also studied prehistoric, pre-Columbian America. Paul Sidney Martin died in 1974 of heart failure and coronary artery disease.

== Research ==
=== Anasazi excavations ===
Martin's Montezuma County project, which spanned from 1928 to 1938, is "enormous by modern standards". In the first season his team of six diggers excavated thirty rooms, four kivas, eight towers and twelve waste heaps at Cutthroat Castle. He developed a theory that the Pueblo ruins actually belong to two types: an earlier known type built on open mesas and a different, rim-rock type of settlement built on the ledges of canyons. In 1929 he continued digging at the Beartooth Pueblo and Little Dog Ruin, focusing his research on the complex relationship between different buildings and passageways. In the beginning of 1930 the Field Museum secured him a blanket excavation license from the Department of Interior. Alfred V. Kidder and Jesse Nusbaum spoke in support of Martin and pledged their responsibility for monitoring Martin's work in the field.

Work in Lowry Pueblo commenced in the summer of 1930. Martin practiced novel Chicago excavation methode and mining technologies learned from Cole and Morley, recorded everything on film, but did not take care to reinforce the exposed walls. They collapsed during the winter. The summer of 1931 brought many celebrated finds: "sixty or seventy pieces of pottery, many sherds, bone tools, minor objects, and about one hundred excellent negatives..." "unlike anything in the area". More finds in 1933 and 1934 led Martin to a conclusion that Lowry Pueblo has witnessed five distinct periods of human occupation, the earliest of which he dated 894 A. D. based on tree ring dating. Martin's writing of the period reflects a duality forced upon a scientist by his employer: Martin the museum employee emphasized tangible loot and the process of finding it, Martin the scientist discussed ancient psychology and cultural patterns, and wondered about the root causes of Native American social evolution. In the end of his life Martin himself wrote that "Mostly, we dug out of curiosity, for fun, for specimens, and to write the historical details for these sites and for this time period ... I fear some of [the excavations] were the result of my callow youth: the desire to make a name for myself by aping Kidder ... [and] to obtain a goodly amount of loot for the Museum, for I was, at the time, very museum minded."

The Lowry campaign was concluded in 1937–1938 with the studies of the settling patterns (Martin himself did not use the term). The 1938 season seemed uninspiring until August when excavations at Basketmareks' Site brought a breakthrough. The new finds pushed the timescale of Pueblo settlements from 1000 A. D. to 400 A. D. Martin's student Carl Lloyd developed a new methode of surveying which enabled quick surveys of large stretches of land. Lloyd reported locating eighty sites over an area of 16.5 square miles (43 km^{2}) in one short season. Another of Martin's students, John Beach Rinaldo, joined the team in 1939 and remained Martin's assistant for a quarter of a century. Martin himself sought a more promising field where he could leave a lasting "scholarly mark on the profession". He decided to move from pure field archaeology into "greener intellectual pastures" and concentrated on the Mogollon culture of Arizona and New Mexico, which was discovered by Emil Haury in 1936.

=== Early publications ===
In 1940 Martin and Elizabeth Willis published Anasazi Painted Pottery in the Field Museum of Natural History, a comprehensive catalogue of over 5,000 ancient Pueblo pottery artifacts. Martin's own contribution to archaeology made before World War II has been overshadowed by his post-war research in Arizona. He was not actively engaged in academic teaching, and thus did not train a stream of graduate students like his contemporary Kidder. Most of his own pre-war works were published by the museum's own press, not peer-reviewed journals.

According to Nash, these papers must now be considered incomplete, failing modern research standards. Martin did not screen the excavated earth for all present things, thus destroying potentially significant evidence (the practice of screening became a standard only in the 1970s). Martin preserved and shipped to Chicago the artifacts that he himself deemed exhibition-worthy; other, less significant, finds were recorded and then abandoned in the field. During the 1936 Lowry Pueblo excavation he described 1,377 objects but catalogued only 598 of them. The balance was lost. A 1998 inventory of the aforementioned collection found only 520 exhibits in place. The other 78 were lost through attrition, theft and deliberate culling by the museum staff. According to Nash, the 1937 and 1938 collections fared even worse. Finally, Martin did not keep or deliberately destroyed the original excavation records - his own and other archaeologists' (Carl Lloyd's). This, according to Nash, was unacceptable even in the 1930s.

=== Mogollon studies ===
In 1939 Martin began excavations at the Stevens-Underwood (SU) site, seven miles (11 km) from Reserve in Catron County, New Mexico. His stated goals were to search for Abajo pottery, study the newly discovered Mogollon culture and the relationship between it and the Anasazi cultures. The first season was dedicated to discovering specific traits that could help draw the line between the Mogollons and other prehistoric people. Nash recovered twelve thousand sherds from only eight excavated pit houses. The origin of these sherds "was deemed critical to determining the location of the earliest pottery in the Southwest." The 1941 season was similar, with an even larger number of sherds found.

World War II interrupted Martin's field research for four years. The hiatus changed the pattern of Martin's life and ultimately his scientific interests. Increased interaction with his peers in Chicago area resulted in a turn to historical analysis of prehistoric society: "how the former inhabitants of the village lived, how they grouped themselves socially, how they solved their subsistence problems, whether they had any religious concepts, and what their particular interests were." According to Martin himself, the change was directly influenced by the work of Fred Eggan and George Murdock. The new approach became the seed of what would become the New Archaeology.

In 1947 Martin excavated the Pine Lawn site in New Mexico. Martin wanted to find the oldest prehistoric settlement in the Southwest. Radiocarbon dating was not introduced yet, and he could only rely on tree ring dating. This approach required a site with a long continuous stock of suitable tree matter, and such a site, Tularosa Cave, was found in 1950 one mile (1.6 km) from Aragon, New Mexico. Earlier known Mogollon sites were open to the elements; Tularosa Cave was buried under a thick layer of soil which preserved the organic remains of the Mogollon culture - maize cobs, shoes, baskets, netting and strings etc. These organic specimens preserved by Martin and Rinaldo enabled later researchers to perform DNA analysis and neutron activation analysis of the site excavated many decades ago.

In 1952 Martin and Rinaldo proposed a new, three-phase classification of pre-Columbian material culture, starting with the earliest one known to them - the Pine Lawn Phase that started around 150 B. C. Martin reasoned that the changes from one phase to another were caused by the diffusion of people and the increase in their dependence on wild, rather than cultivated, plants that coincided with a decrease in hunting. Studies of food habits brought Martin in tighter contact with biologists; his associate Hugh Cutter coined the term cultural ecology in 1956. By 1956 Martin seemed to understand everything about the Mogollons except one thing - why did this culture disappeared in the 14th century?

=== New Archaeology ===
In 1955 Martin became lecturer in anthropology at the University of Chicago and for the first time in his life began intensive work with students. He gradually stepped aside from field archaeology; his former authoritative management style became democratic and forgiving, and he even allowed women to archaeologists' camps. In 1957 and 1958 he managed excavation in Little Ortega, Laguna Salada and Table Rock Pueblo, but reports on this research were written primarily by Rinaldo.

In 1960 Martin obtained a National Science Foundation research grant that had, in retrospect, significantly changed the scope of archaeology at the Field Museum. According to the terms of the grant, the museum became the first institution to practice pollen analysis in archaeology. Martin admitted that he did not really know what to make of it; actual research was carried out by James Schoenwetter who concluded that around 1000 A. D. the American Southwest witnessed a radical climate change.

Looking back into the past, Martin critically reassessed his own input; by 1962 dissatisfaction developed into a deep personal crisis. Martin wrote that "I have dumped all my research prior to 1962" and that his lengthy field reports produced over thirty years were just "boring repetitions of minute detail". He continued work at the university and still managed field expeditions, but practically quit writing. Only one of Martin's last ten excavations was adequately published; the paper was released posthumously by his students.
