= Pleasant View, Colorado =

Unincorporated community in Montezuma County, CO, USA

- Unincorporated community
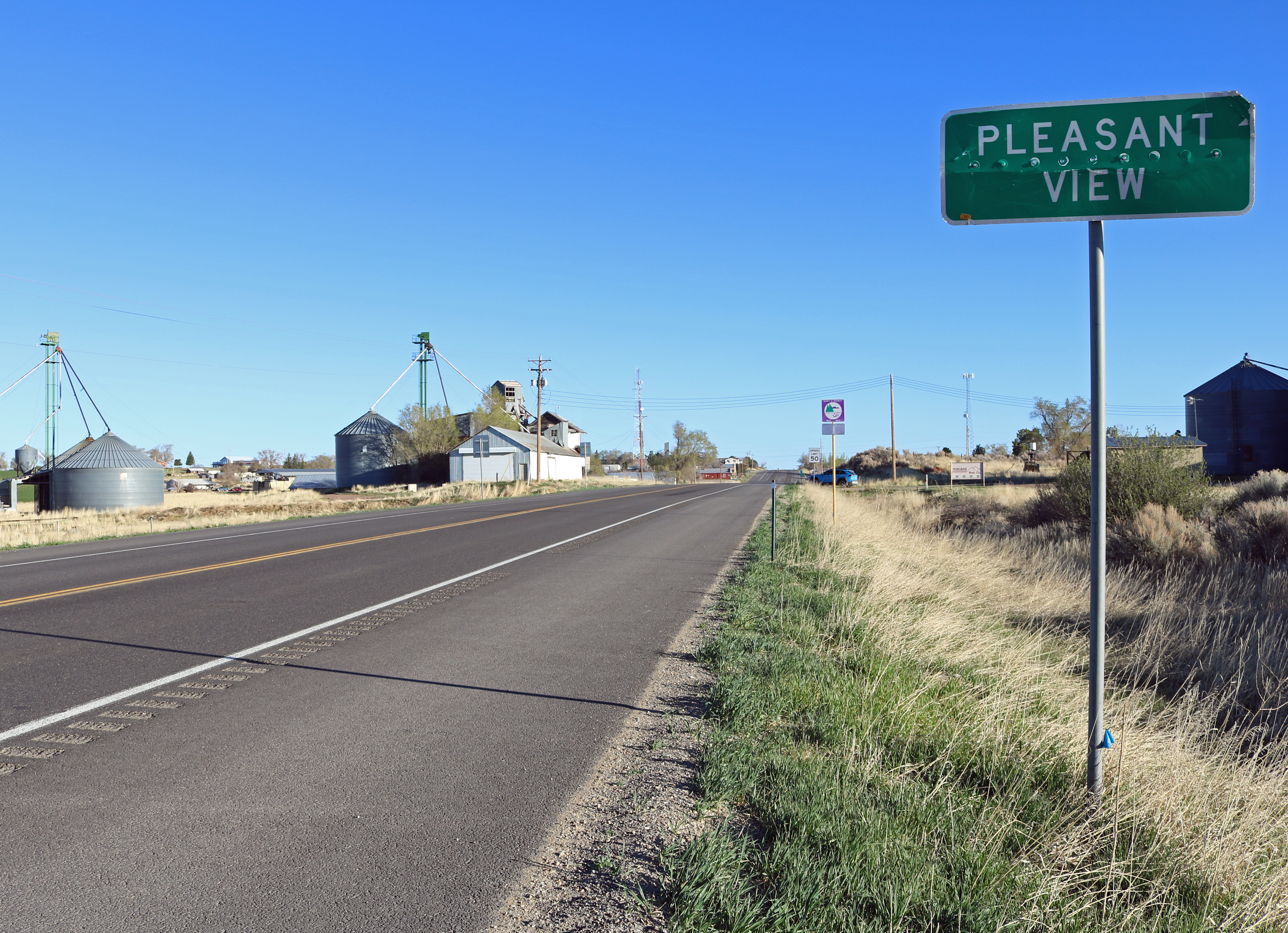
- Looking north along Highway 491 in Pleasant View

- Location within Colorado Location within the United States
- Coordinates: 37°35′22″N 108°45′54″W
- Country: United States
- State: Colorado
- County: Montezuma
- Elevation: 6,913 ft (2,107 m)
- Time zone: UTC-7 (MST)
  - Summer (DST): UTC-6 (MDT)
- ZIP code: 81331
- Area code: 970
- GNIS feature ID: 176857

Pleasant View is an unincorporated community and a U.S. Post Office located in Montezuma County, Colorado, United States. The Pleasant View Post Office has the ZIP Code 81331.

Pleasant View should not be confused with the census-designated places in Jefferson County known as West Pleasant View and East Pleasant View.

== History ==
Several historic places near or in Pleasant View are on the Colorado State Register of Historic Properties or the National Register of Historic Places:

- James A. Lancaster Site, also known as the Clawson Ruin, is an ancient pueblo archaeological site on the National Register of Historic Places
- Pigge Site, located near Lowry Ruin, contains several pueblo ruins and a great kiva and is also on the National Register.
- Puzzle House, is a pueblo settlement occupied three times, first about AD 650 and two occupations between AD 1075-1225. The site is on the state register.

== Demographics ==
The median income for a household was $16,631 in 2009. In 2000, the median income for a household was $45,897.

The median resident age was 38.6 years.

== Education ==
Pleasant View Public Schools are part of the Montezuma-Cortez School District RE-1. The district has one preschool, five elementary schools, one middle school and one high school.

Pleasant View Elementary School is located in Pleasant View. The other schools in the district are located in Cortez, and include Montezuma-Cortez RE-1 Pre-School, Kemper Elementary School, Lewis-Arriola Elementary School, Manaugh Elementary School, Mesa Elementary Schools, Cortez Middle School and Montezuma-Cortez High School. The high school mascot is the Panthers.

== See also ==
- Canyons of the Ancients National Monument
- Hovenweep National Monument
- Lowry Ruin National Historic Landmark
- Old Spanish National Historic Trail
