= Mesa Verde region =

Part of the Colorado Plateau

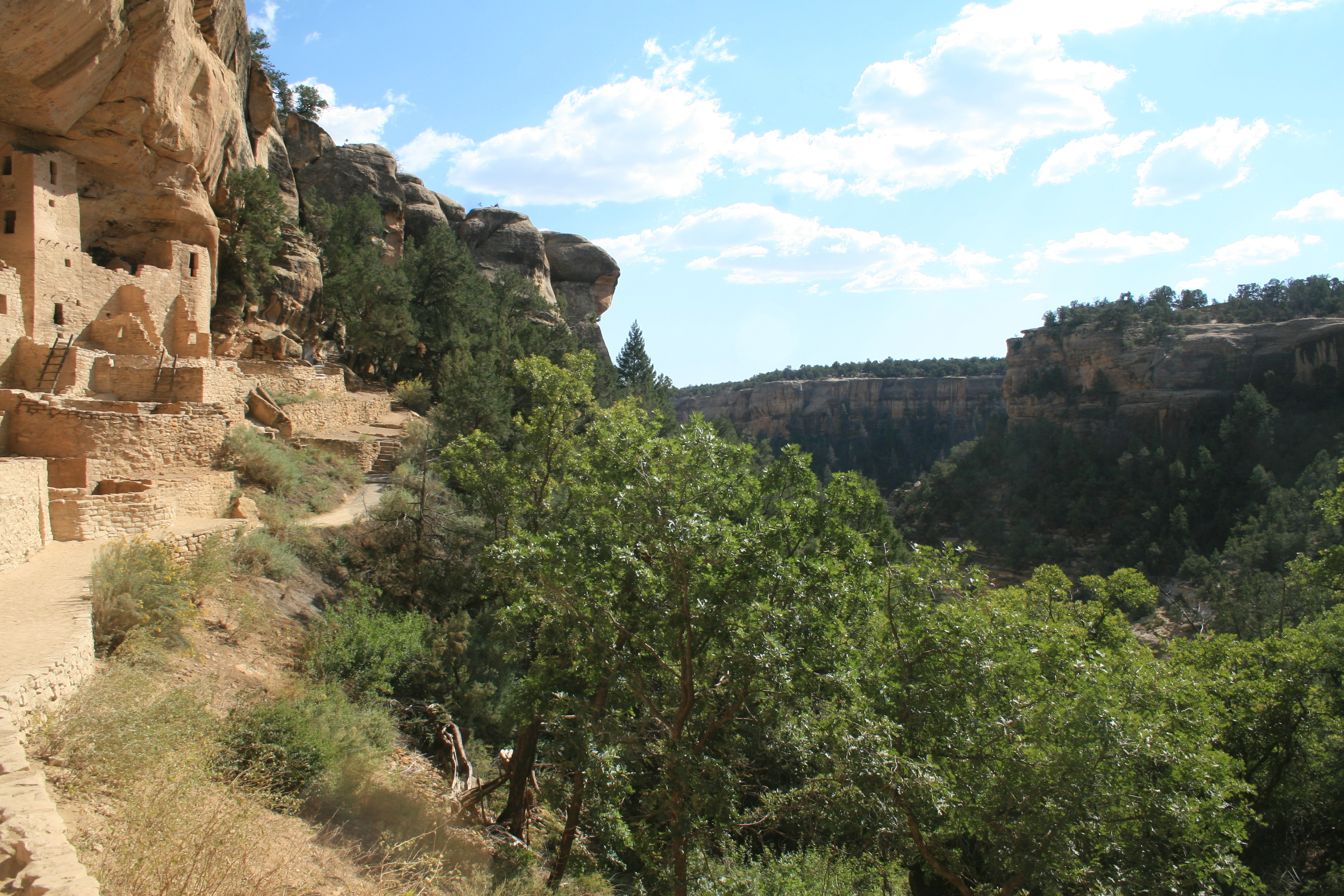
Mesa Verde National Park, Colorado. Cliff Canyon, as seen from the Cliff Palace.

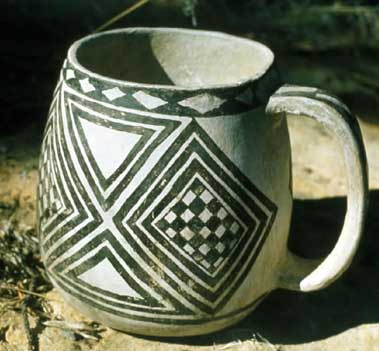
Mesa Verde mug, made in 13th century, MVNP museum collections

The Mesa Verde Region is a portion of the Colorado Plateau in the United States that extends through parts of New Mexico, Colorado and Utah. It is bounded by the San Juan River to the south, the Piedra River to the east, the San Juan Mountains to the north and the Colorado River to the west.

The Crow Canyon Archaeological Center near Cortez, Colorado, in the heart of the Mesa Verde, has been conducting research in the region since 1982. Although the Mesa Verde National Park contains the largest and best known ruins of the Pueblo peoples, there are many other community centers in the central Mesa Verde region dating to the period between 1050 and 1290 AD. This is a huge area covering over 150,000 square miles (390,000 km^{2}). Over 130 centers containing fifty or more residential structures have been identified in the central region, many of which have yet to be examined in any detail.

A small portion of the Mesa Verde to the southeast of Cortez, Colorado contains the Mesa Verde National Park, which protects almost 5,000 archaeological sites, including 600 cliff dwellings of the Ancestral Puebloans who lived in the area between 600 and 1300 AD. Other parks in the Mesa Verde from west to east include the Glen Canyon National Recreation Area, Natural Bridges National Monument, Hovenweep National Monument, Yucca House National Monument and Aztec Ruins National Monument.

== Pueblo people of the Mesa Verde Region ==
The first pueblo people settled in the Mesa Verde region around about AD 550. Around this time, the Mesa Verde Region experienced rapid population growth, bringing in technological change and progress in terms of weaponry, crop harvesting, and artifacts.

=== A.D. 750 to 900 ===
Around AD 750, people of the Mesa Verde region began conglomerating into densely populated villages. Pithouses were a common feature during this period, however archaeologists believe the people of the region spent most of their time in structures built above ground that included living spaces, and storage spaces.

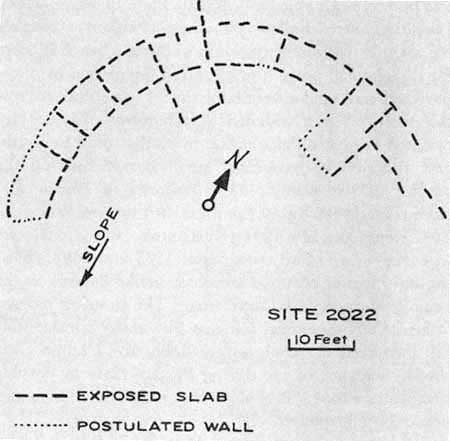
Sketch of Pueblo I crescent-shaped village (Mesa Verde site 2022) Source: National Park Service

These structures formed rows of rooms in straight or crescent shaped formations. During this period, the pueblo people began constructing larger public buildings, leading archaeologists to believe that the inception of religious, economic and political institutions in this society came around this time.

=== A.D. 900–1150 ===
Around AD 900, a rapid decline in population saw many people move down into the cliff alcoves that were home to their ancestors many centuries before. Archaeologists are unsure what caused this dramatic shift, however many suspected it was climate-related changes that instigated this shift.

Around AD 1000, large structural development advancements were made, such as moving from pole-and-adobe construction to stone masonry, thick-walled stone buildings that were built up higher and could provide more residential and storage capacity.

=== A.D. 1150–1300 ===
During this period of time, a large population of the pueblo people resided in large multi-storied living spaces

Networks centered on Chaco Canyon grew and allowed the pueblo people to connect with other settlements. The "Chaco World", as referred to by archaeologists, is noted for its distinctive architecture, with one notable unique feature a type of building called a 'great house'. These are massive, multi-room multi-storey masonry structures with significantly larger rooms and kivas built inside the structure itself.

Subsequently, by AD 1250 a significant population of the pueblo people of the Mesa Verde region transitioned from their farmsteads to new homes in current day Arizona and New Mexico. This change meant new groups of hunter-gatherers moved into the region.

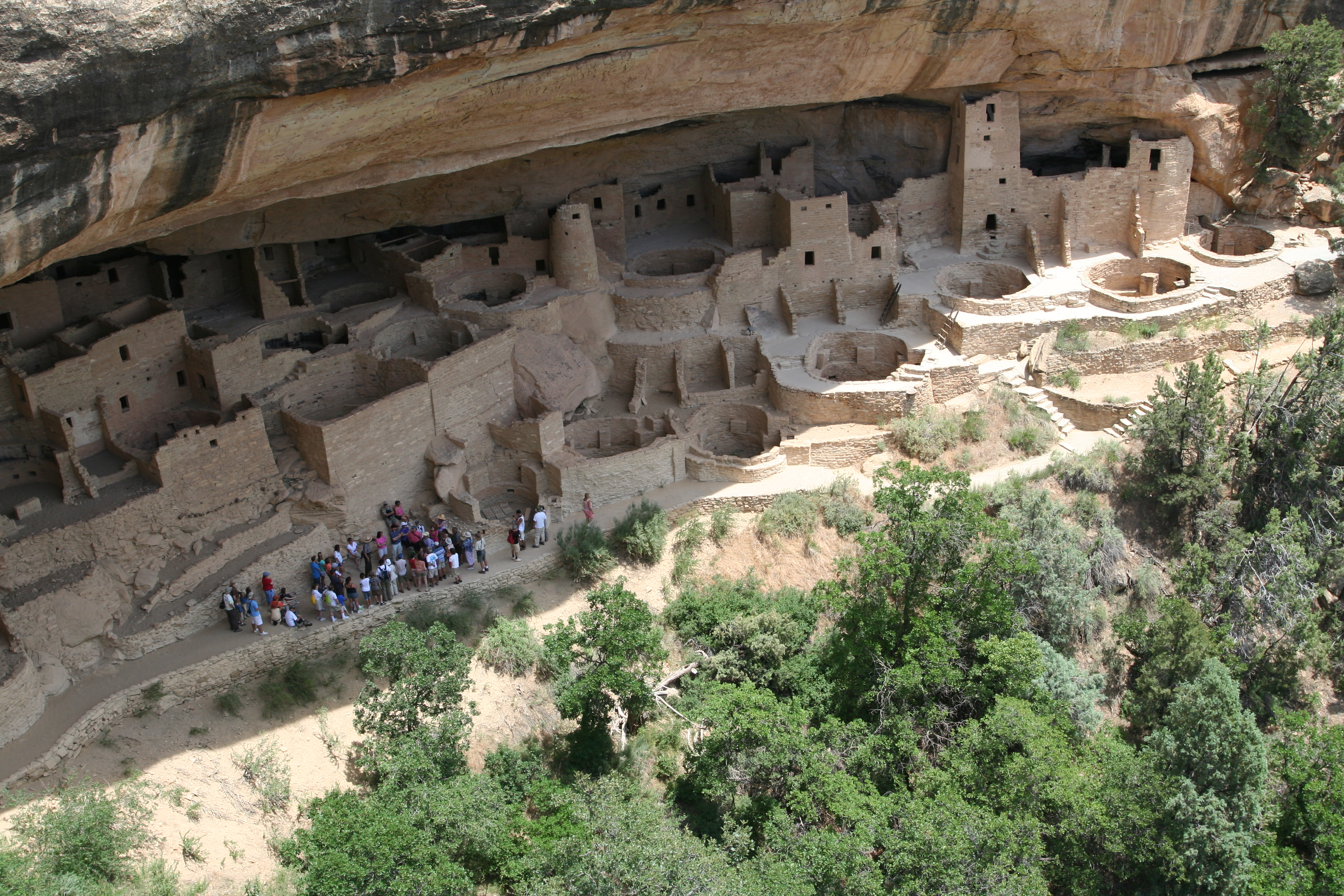
Cliff Palace at Mesa Verde National Park
