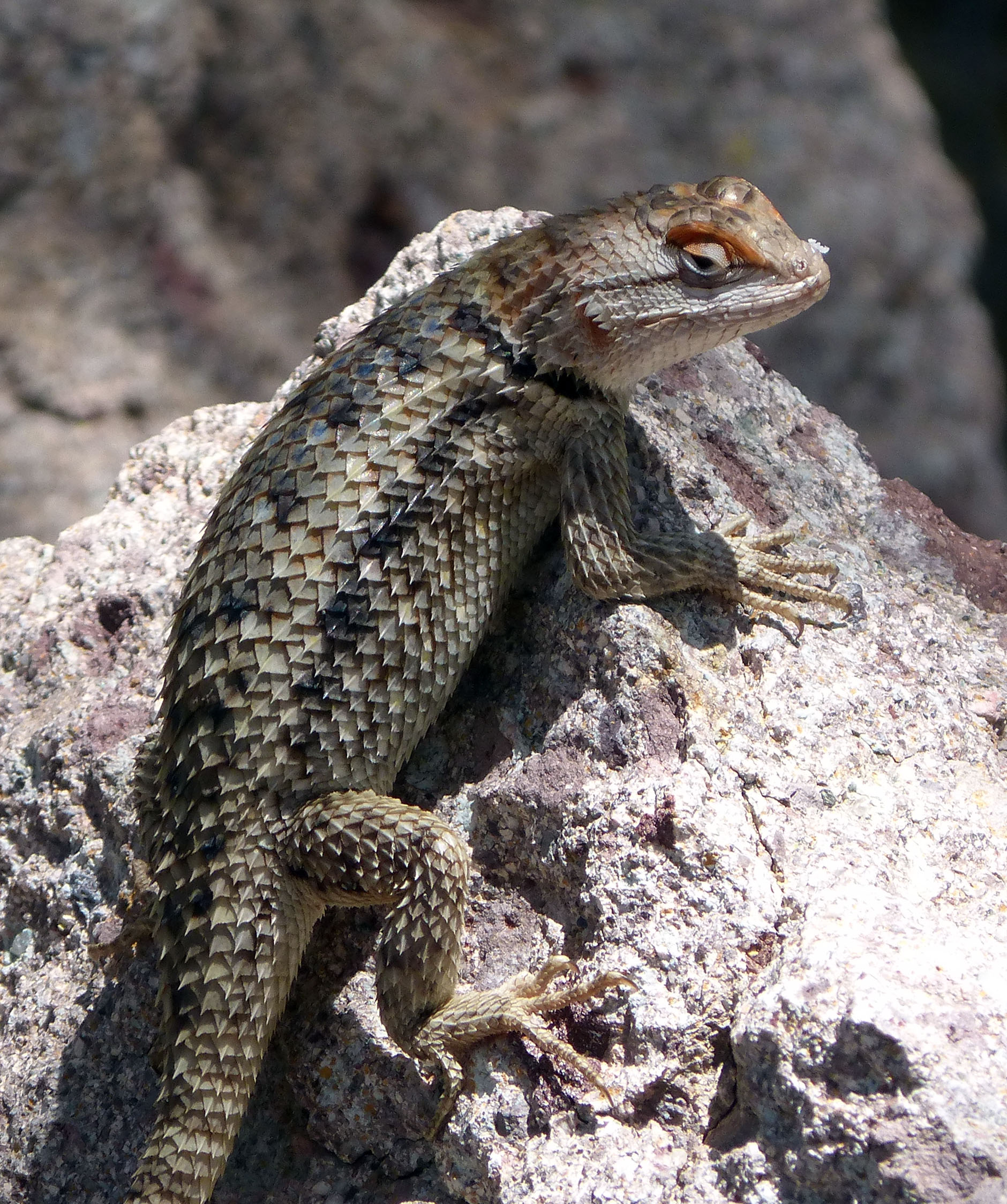

Scientific classification
- Domain: Eukaryota
- Kingdom: Animalia
- Phylum: Chordata
- Class: Reptilia
- Order: Squamata
- Suborder: Iguania
- Family: Phrynosomatidae
- Genus: Sceloporus
- Species: S. bimaculosus

Binomial name
- Sceloporus bimaculosus Phelan & Brattstrom, 1955

= Sceloporus bimaculosus =

Species of lizard

Sceloporus bimaculosus, the twin-spotted spiny lizard, is a species of lizard in the family Phrynosomatidae. It is found in New Mexico and Texas in the United States and Mexico.
