= Canyons of the Ancients Visitor Center and Museum =

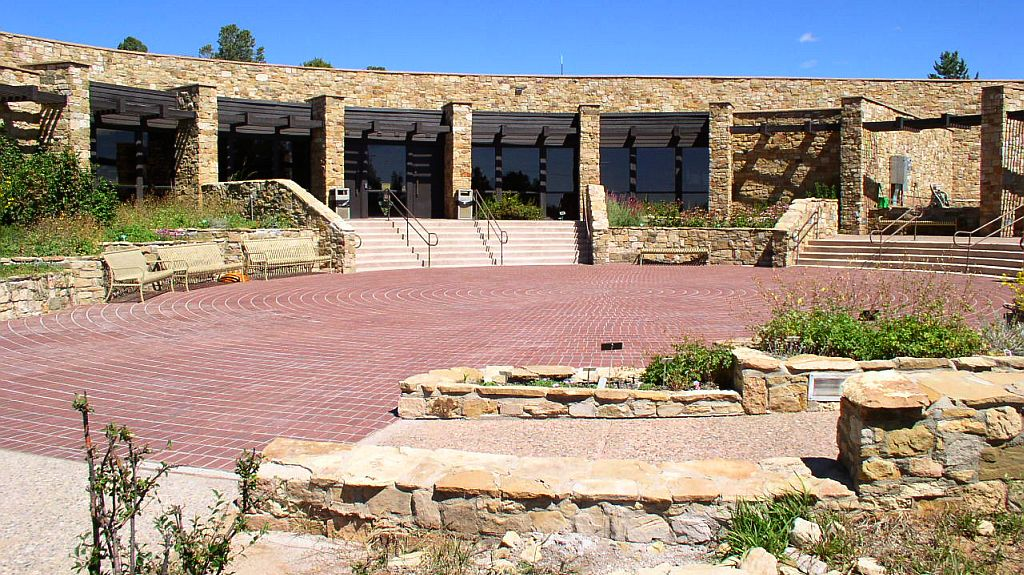
- Established: 1988
- Location: 27501 Highway 184; Dolores, Colorado
- Coordinates: 37.4761°N 108.5460°W
- Type: Archaeological museum
- Website: Official site

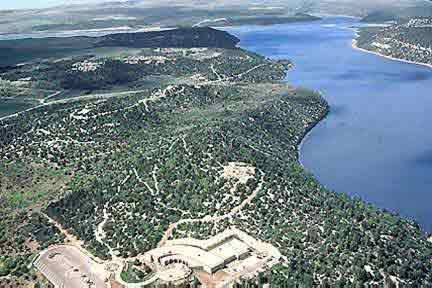
Anasazi Heritage Center, Aerial View

Regional map of Ancient Pueblo peoples, or Anasazi, centered on the Four Corners

The Canyons of the Ancients Visitor Center and Museum (formerly the Anasazi Heritage Center) located in Dolores, Colorado, is an archaeological museum of Native American pueblo and hunter-gatherer cultures. Two 12th-century archaeological sites, the Escalante and Dominguez Pueblos, at the center were once home to Ancient Pueblo peoples. The museum's permanent and special exhibits display some of the 3 million mostly Ancestral Puebloan artifacts curated at the facility. The center also houses a public research library, educational resources and a museum shop. Wheelchair-accessible facilities include a picnic area and an interpreted nature and cultural trail.

== Ancient Pueblo people ==
Ancestral Puebloan people resided in permanent communities called pueblos and grew their own crops, in addition to hunting and gathering. The Ancient Pueblo people may have lived in the Four Corners area as early as 1500 BC. As many as 20,000 - 30,000 people lived and farmed in the Montezuma County, Colorado area. Each person required about one acre of land for up to 40 harvested bushels of corn per year. Other sources of food were obtained through hunting wild game and gathering wild plants, like berries and piñon nuts, growth of beans and squash and hunting. The area was affected by periods of drought, including one in the late 13th century. That and other factors resulted in the permanent move by 1300 AD of area pueblo people south to present-day New Mexico and Arizona. Anasazi, a term commonly attributed to ancient pueblo people, has been used since its first archaeological publication in the 1930s. The Navajo word does not represent specific tribes but means ancient enemy or outsider. The term is disliked by the modern Pueblo people who hold their ancient ancestors sacred and celebrated through spiritual rituals and journeys.

== Escalante and Dominguez Pueblos ==
The Escalante and Dominguez Pueblos, located next to the Visitor Center and Museum, were homes of Ancestral Pueblo people three times. Escalante Pueblo was constructed approximately 1120 to 1130 AD and made of groupings of stone walled family and communal rooms, including kivas. The architecture is like that of the Chaco Canyon in present-day New Mexico. The pueblo was also occupied about 1150 AD and again 1200 AD.

Near the Escalante Pueblo is another small prehistoric household called Dominguez Pueblo, an example of independent family homes outside the main pueblo. Discovered at the site were items that shed light on how the people may have lived, including "6,900 turquoise, jet and shell beads; a shell and turquoise frog pendant and mosaics, two fine ceramic vessels, six bone scrapers, a woven mat and many other items."

The two interpreted prehistoric pueblos on the grounds of the Visitor Center and Museum are named in honor of the two Spanish Franciscan friars, Francisco Atanasio Domínguez and Silvestre Vélez de Escalante, who recorded these ancient archaeological sites during the Domínguez–Escalante expedition in 1776.

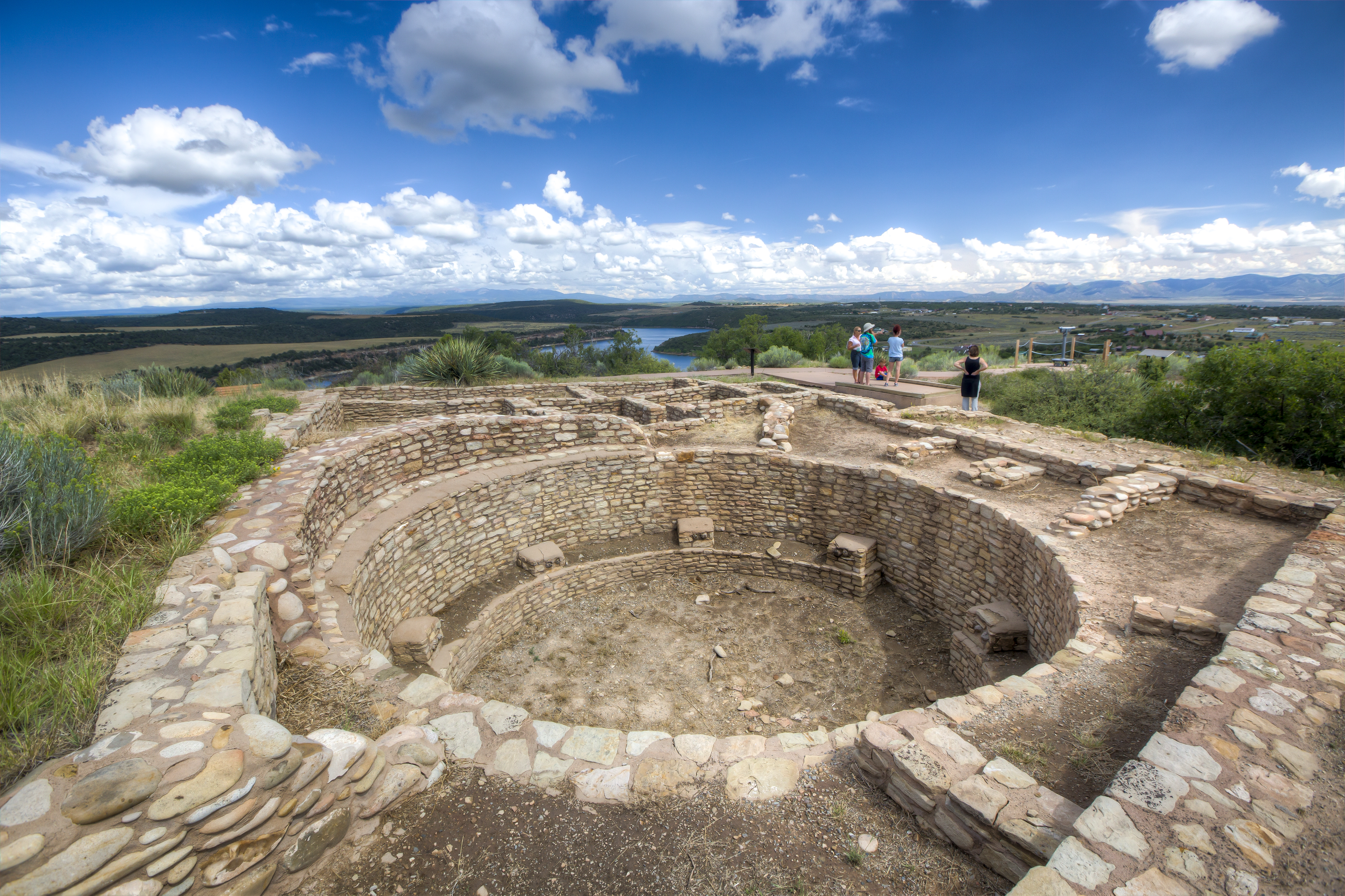
Escalante Pueblo and McPhee Reservoir

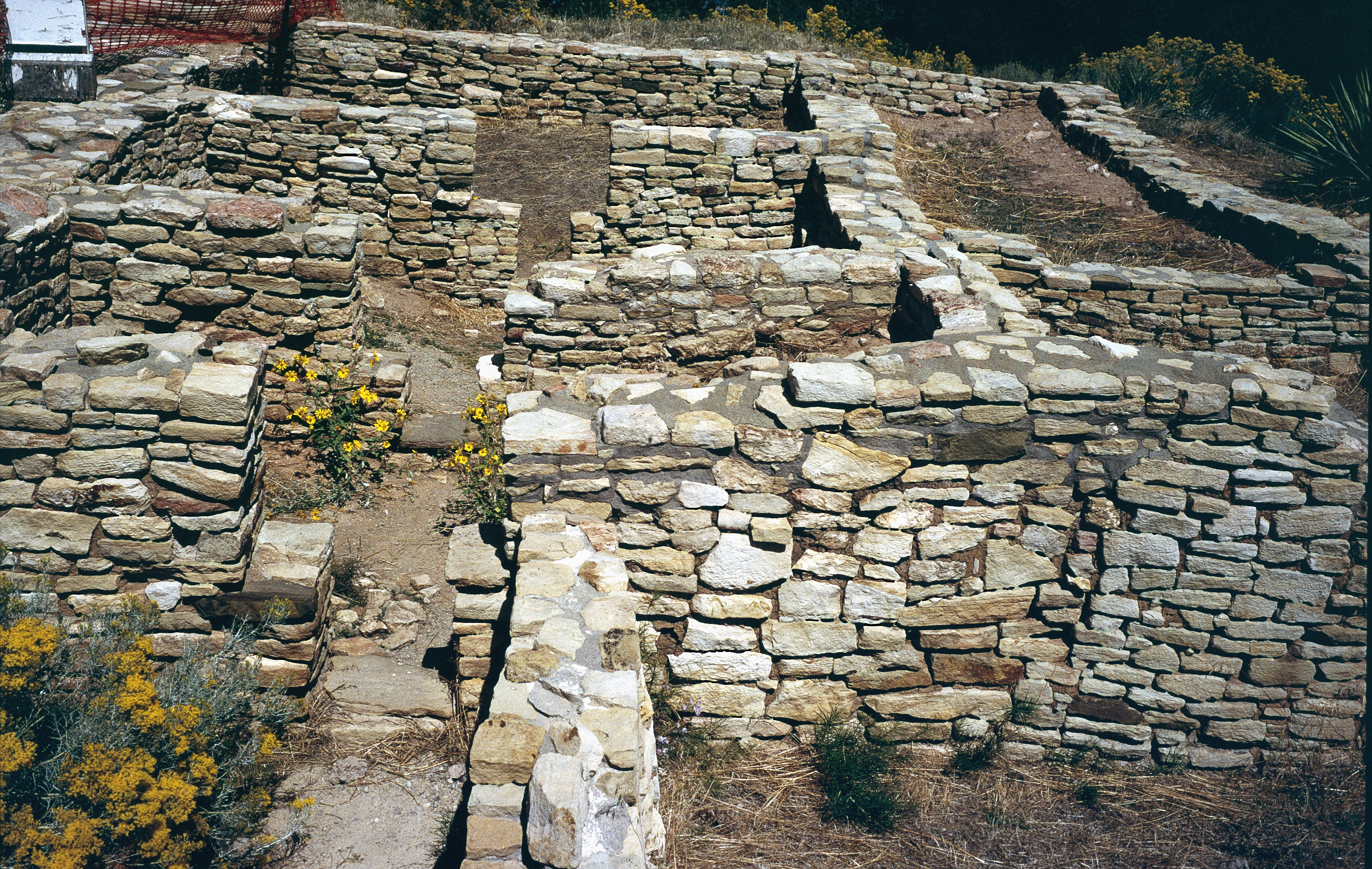
Escalante Pueblo, house walls

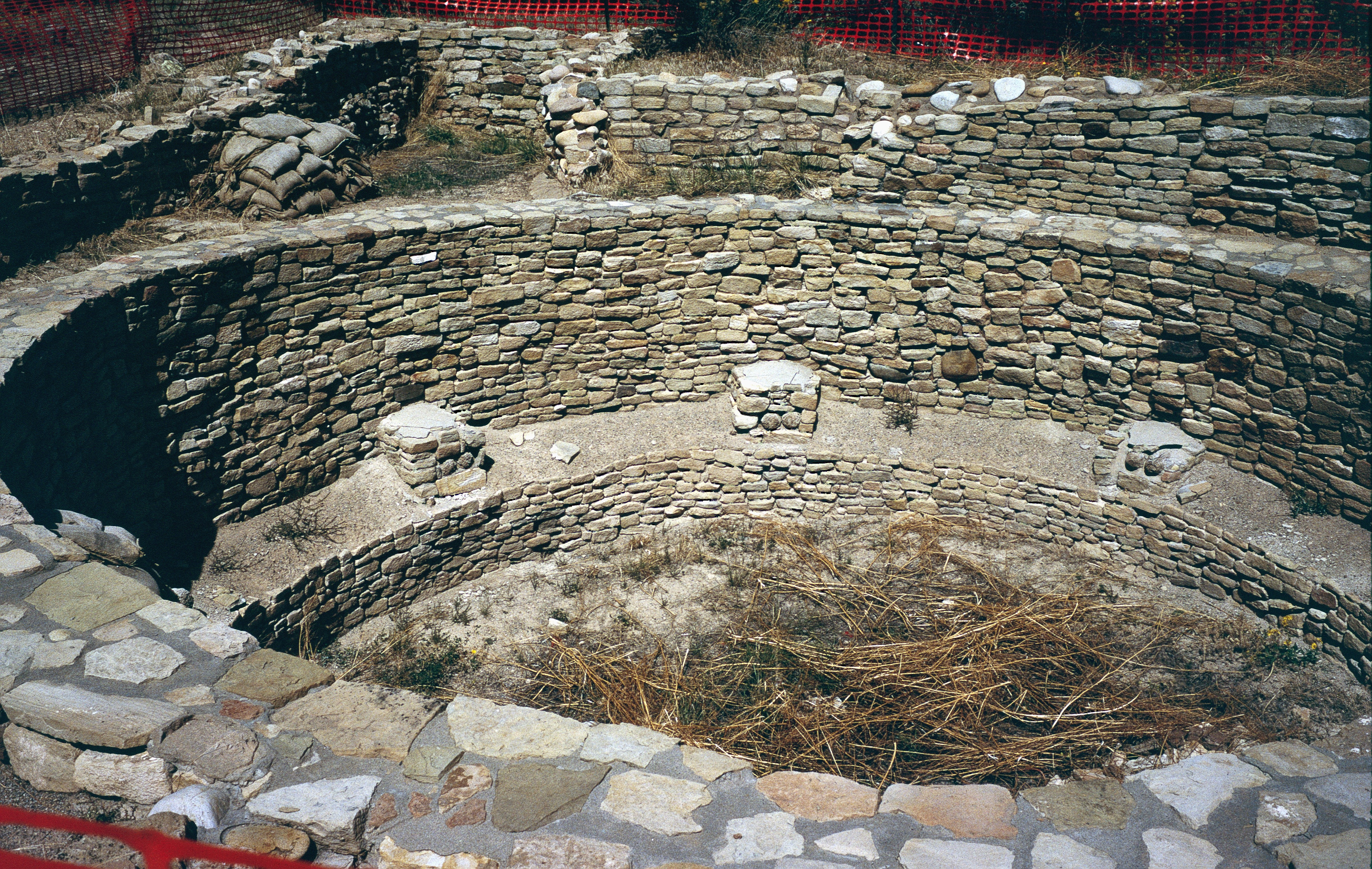
Escalante Pueblo, kiva

Dominguez Pueblo

== Museum and visitor center ==
The Bureau of Land Management owns and manages the museum and facilities. The Heritage Center, in operation since 1988, is also the visitor center for the Canyons of the Ancients National Monument.

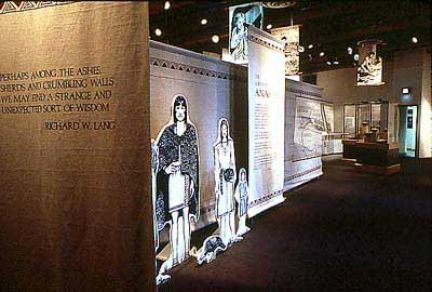
Anasazi Heritage Center, Museum

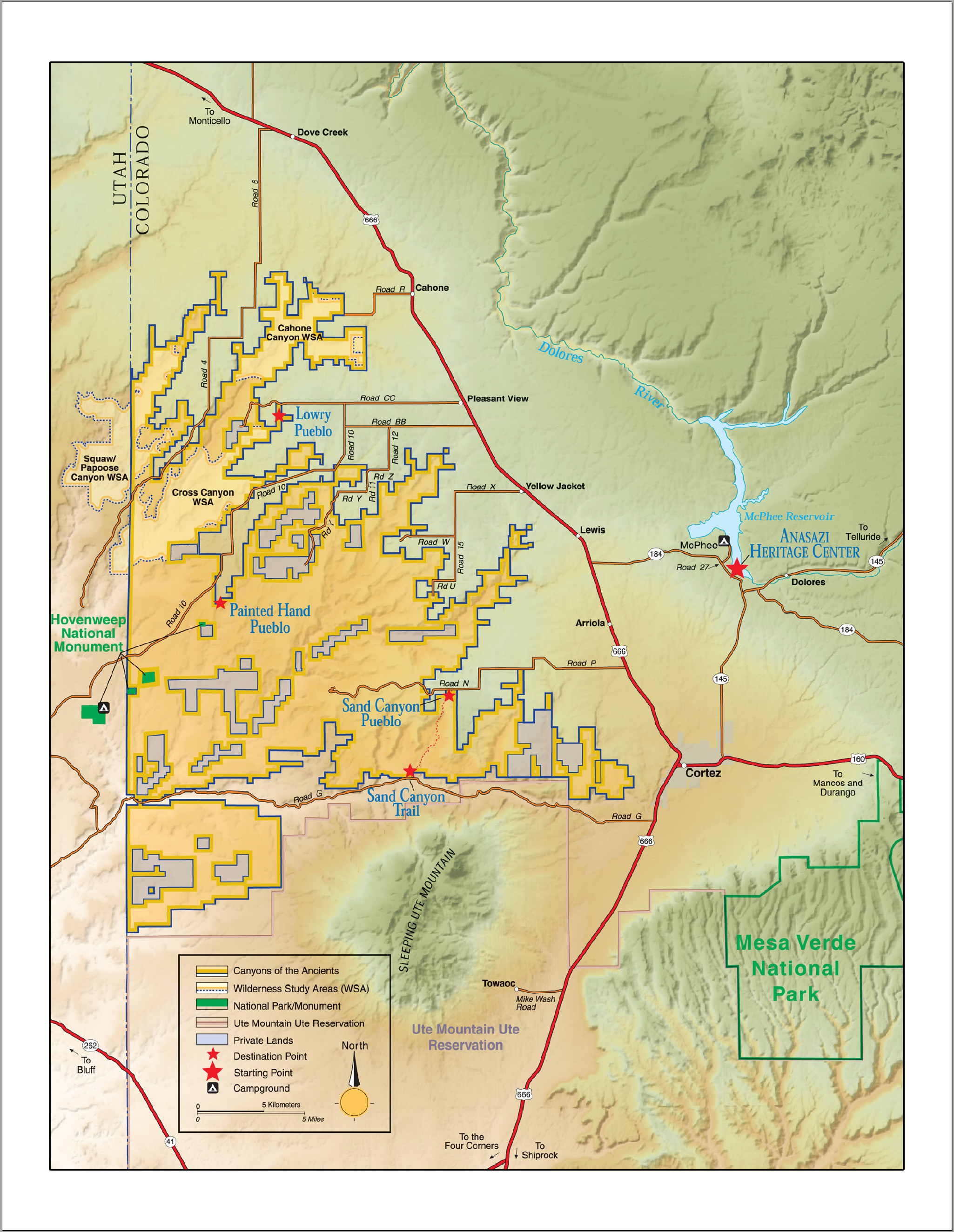
Map of Canyon of the Ancients National Monument

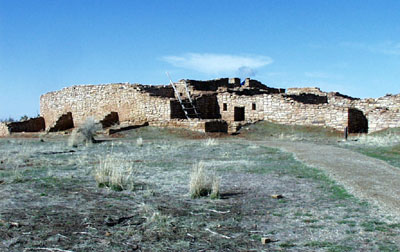
Lowry Pueblo, Canyon of the Ancients

== Related archaeological and heritage sites ==
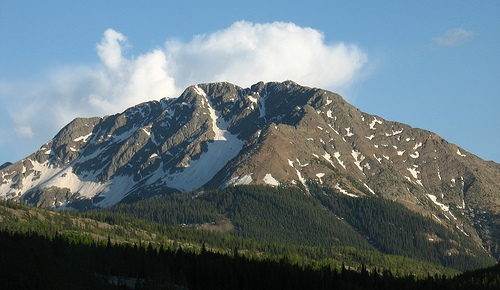
San Juan National Forest
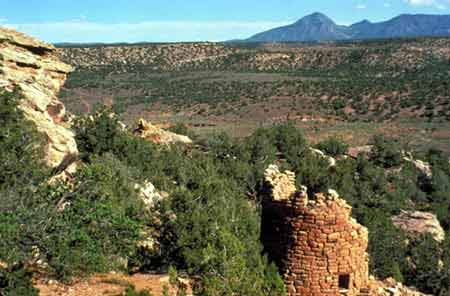
Canyons of the Ancients National Monument

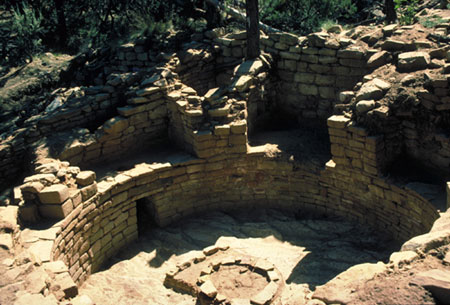
Kiva ruins at Canyons of the Ancients

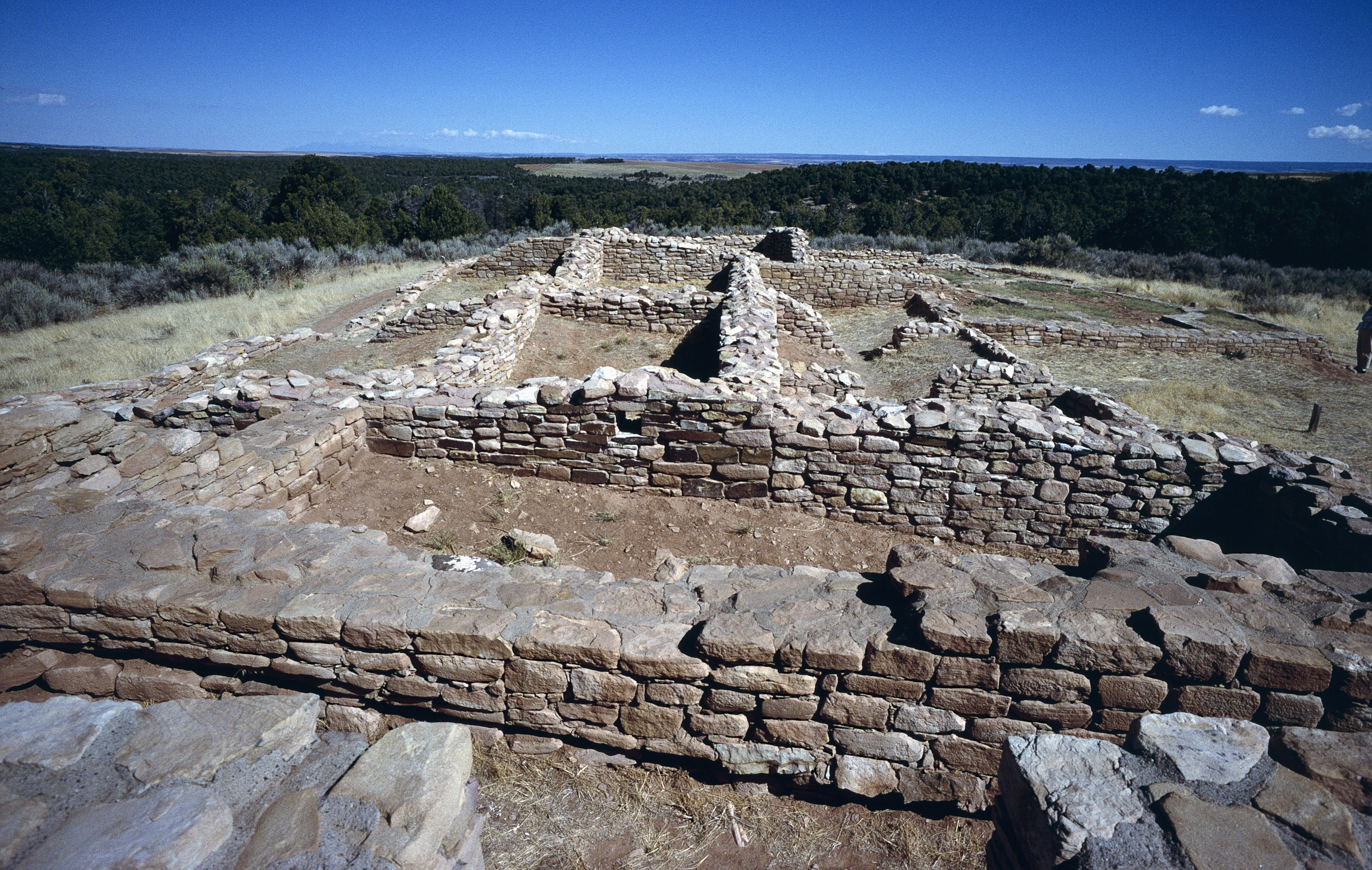
Lowry Pueblo

Hovenweep Castle

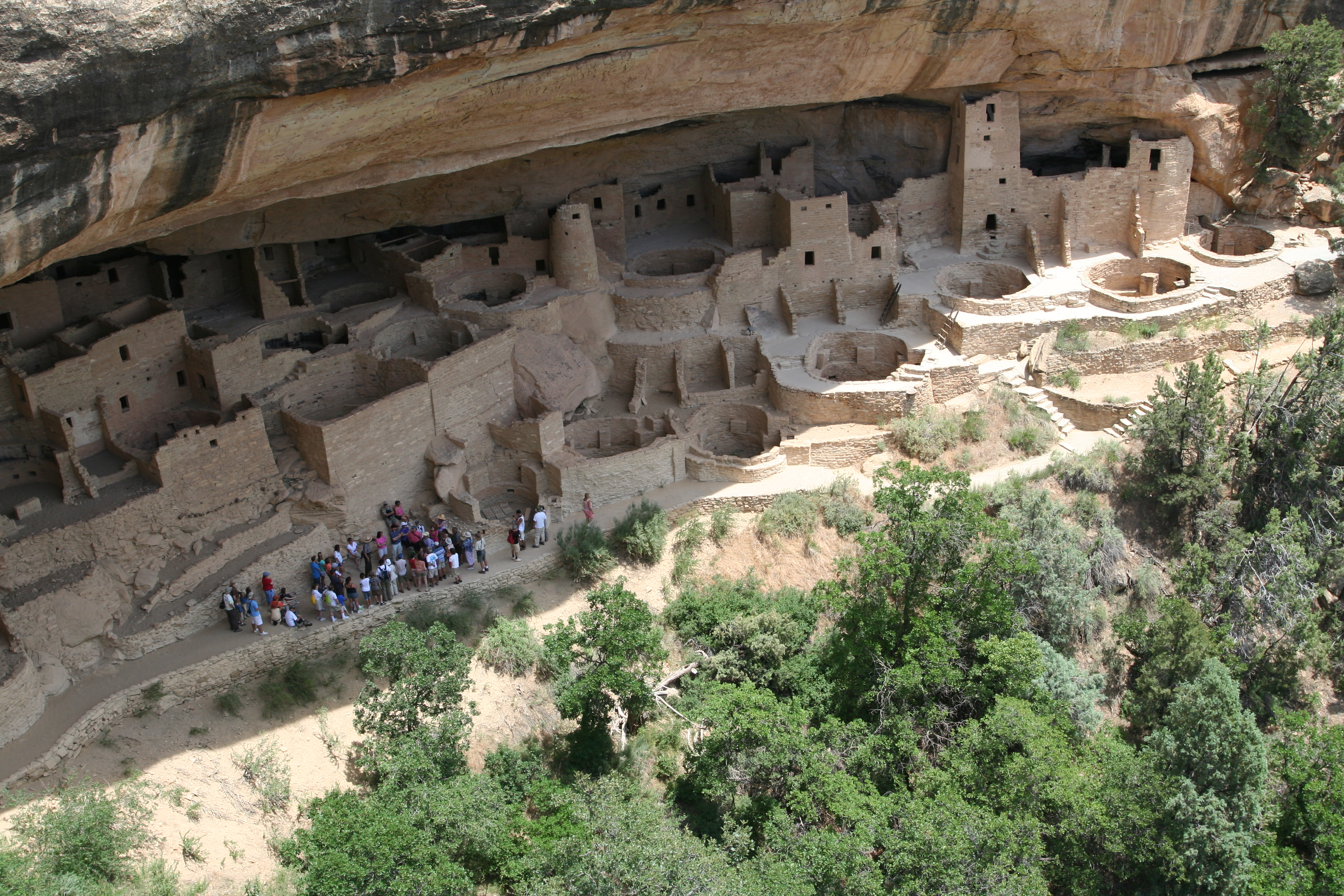
Mesa Verde National Park, Cliff Palace

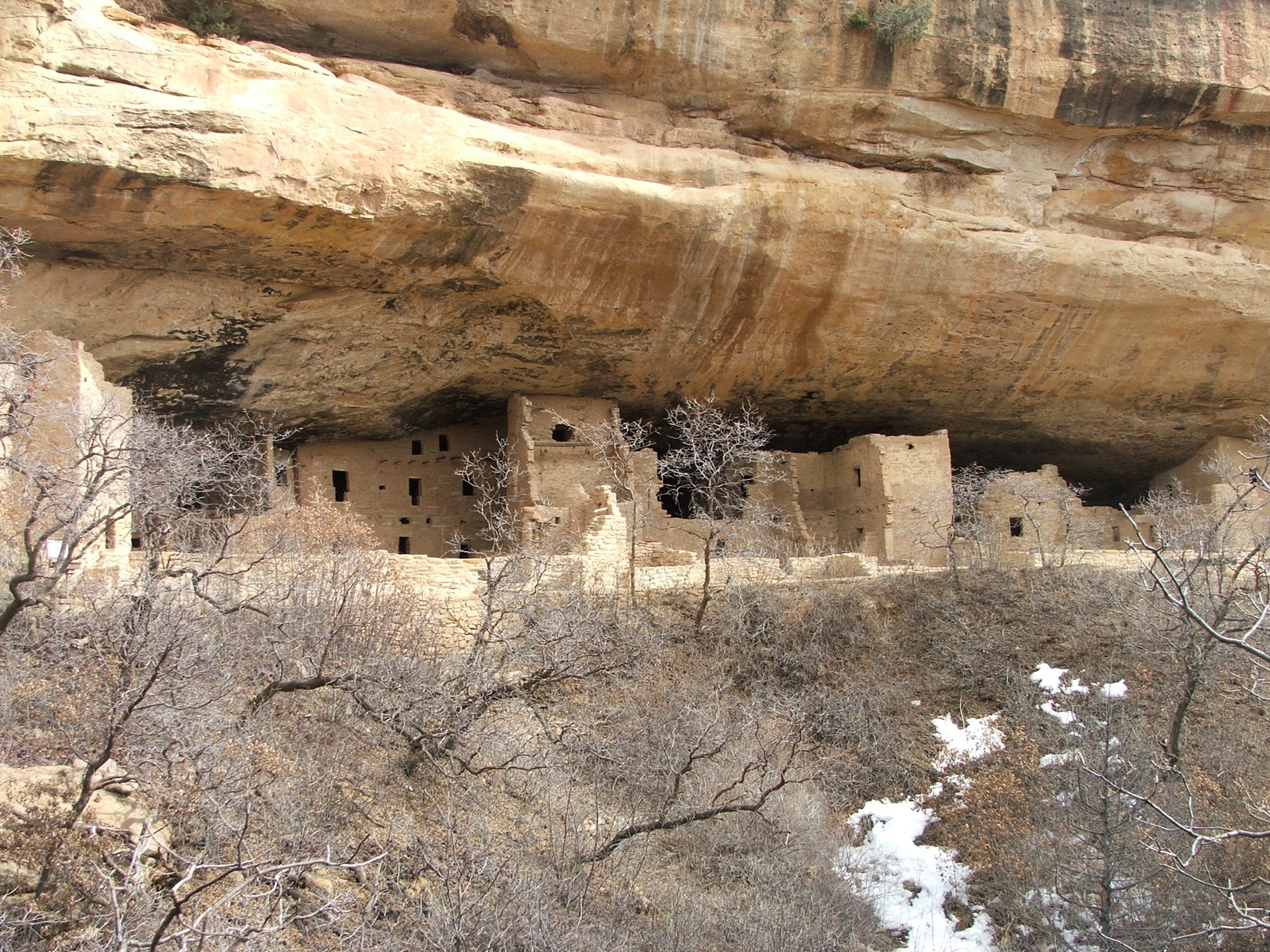
Mesa Verde National Park, Spruce Tree House

== See also ==
Other neighboring Ancient Pueblo sites in Colorado

- Canyons of the Ancients National Monument
- Crow Canyon Archaeological Center
- Hovenweep National Monument
- Mesa Verde National Park

Other cultures in the Four Corners region

- Trail of the Ancients
- List of ancient dwellings of Pueblo peoples

Early American cultures

- List of prehistoric sites in Colorado
- Ancestral Puebloans
- Oasisamerica cultures
- Paleo-Indians
