= Crow Canyon Archaeological Center =

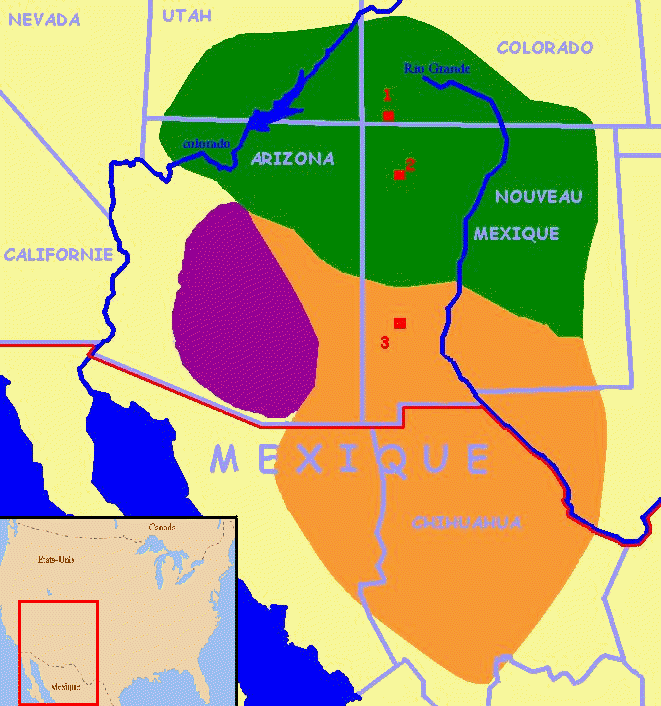
- Location of the archaeological center (point 1 near the Rio Grande) within Anasazi territory (green area) in Colorado

Location
- Cortez, Colorado; United States
- Coordinates: 37.354454°N 108.620416°W

Information
- Founded: 1974
- Founder: Dr. Edward Berger
- Category: Archaeology teaching and research center
- President: Elizabeth (Liz) Perry, PhD
- Website: www.crowcanyon.org

Crow Canyon Archaeological Center is a 170-acre (69 ha) research center and "living classroom" located in southwestern Colorado, US, which offers experiential education programs for students and adults.

Crow Canyon is a center for archaeological research, education, and preservation of the history of the Ancient Pueblo peoples, who lived on and in the cliff dwellings of Mesa Verde more than seven centuries ago. Established by private cultural initiatives that continue the work of American benefactors, the center provides hands-on programs for people to experience archaeological excavation of Native American sites.

== Brief history ==
Crow Canyon is the result of work in experiential and hands-on education started in 1967 by Edward F. Berger, a history teacher with the Cherry Creek Schools near Denver, Colorado. Berger brought students to SW Colorado and involved them in building community and programs that increased motivation and accelerated learning. Because of the rich prehistoric cultural base in the area, archaeology was added to the curricula and Berger, with the help of Dr. Art Rohn (then of Wichita State University) supported Rohn's graduate students to teach and supervise high school students doing original research excavating ancient pueblo sites. The development of this arrangement with academic scholars and the involvement and teaching of high school age students is believed to be first of its kind.

In 1972, Berger began working through the University of Northern Colorado on a doctoral program designed to create and field test experiential, motivational, and accelerated learning programs. These programs were interdisciplinary, supplemental high school credit courses. In 1972, Berger wrote the non-profit corporation Crow Canyon operates under today. Then it was called I-S Education Programs. In 1974, Berger purchased 80 acres of land west of Cortez, Colorado on Crow Canyon and began designing a year-round campus. He earned his Ed.D. in 1975. His research into learning continued and from 1975 until 1986, Berger, now joined by his wife Joanne, pioneered new and effective learning and teaching techniques. The challenge was taking a student from zero knowledge about SW history and archaeology to working alongside of an academic scholar – and being effective – in two days. The accelerated learning techniques he developed made this possible.

The original campus facilities were basic, but "better than tents". Educational programs were expanded to age groups 10–80 years of age. Dr. Ron Gould was the first staff archaeologist and teacher. Significant involvement with the Ute Mountain Ute Tribe resulted in special Native American programs on campus and deep and lasting relationships with Ute Neighbors. Survey work in the areas west of the campus resulted in the identification and naming of sites (Smithsonian Numbers). Many bear the names of the schools across the US whose students identified them.

By the early 80s, Crow Canyon was well known for its educational programs and its archaeological research. The Bergers needed capital to improve the campus and to free them of 24/7/365 responsibility. They learned of the Foundation for Illinois Archaeology and its fledgling program at Kampsville, Illinois. A young and dynamic man, Clark Hinsdale, was building an educational component. Bergers contacted professor Struever at Northwestern University who headed the FIA. Struever was a successful fundraiser and promoter. By 1983, negotiations resulted in a merger of the two non-profit corporations (note that Non-profit corporations are not bought and sold). FIA then changed its name to The Center for American Archaeology (at Northwestern University). CAA paid off I-SEP's debts and Bergers donated 70 acres of land. A new lodge designed to house 40 students was built. A lab building was provided. Additional research archaeologists were hired, and Bergers identified two major sites for research: Sand Canyon Pueblo, and the Duckfoot Site. Southwest archaeologists coordinated the research design and standards, academic supervision, and selection of staff archaeologists.

In the spring of 1986, knowing that the center was on firm ground, Jo and Ed Berger resigned their positions of executive director and associate director respectively. They were able to pick their successor, Ian Sandy Thompson. So much had been accomplished and the model that drives Crow Canyon today had been tested and functioning for almost 18 years.

== Today ==
Since its foundation, the mission of Crow Canyon has been to preserve and protect the rich heritage of the ancient Pueblo Indians (or Anasazi) of the American Southwest and to educate the public of the need to preserve and protect archaeological resources. Archaeological research has been conducted in the Mesa Verde region with the goal of teaching archaeology through hands-on experience. Students and teachers alike are invited to participate in research in the archaeological camp.

Key initiatives include education, research, and cultural programs. Past President and CEO Deborah Gangloff defined Crow Canyon's programs as an opportunity: "to not only learn archaeology and do archaeology...but also to have some fun".

== Awards and recognition ==
2010 Society for American Archaeology 7.5 Film Fest award for the film Visit With Respect (collaborative project by Crow Canyon, the Anasazi Heritage Center, and the San Juan Mountains Association)

2008 National Trust for Historic Preservation's National Preservation Honor Award

2008 Colorado Historical Society's Caroline Bancroft History Award for the film Visit with Respect (awarded to the Anasazi Heritage Center for a collaborative project with Crow Canyon and the San Juan Mountains Association)

2006 Colorado Historical Society's Caroline Bancroft History Award for project titled "Making History: Engaging the Public in Reconstructing the Past"

2006 Colorado Preservation, Inc., State Honor Award for project titled "Ancient Images, Pueblo Perspectives" (co-recipient with the Anasazi Heritage Center)

2003 Colorado Historical Society's Stephen H. Hart Award for Leadership in Educational Programming in Colorado Archaeology

2003 Princeton Review: The Best 109 Internships

2002 Awesome Library Editor's Choice for Castle Rock Pueblo: A Trip Through Time

1999 Society for American Archaeology's Award for Excellence in Public Education

1992 President's Historic Preservation Award

1991 El Pomar Foundation's Henry McAllister Award for Excellence in Special Projects

== Excavation sites ==
There are several excavation sites at the Crow Canyon Archaeological Center. They may be used as part of the Center's programs for further excavation and study.

Crow Canyon Archaeological Center Sites
| Site name | Location | Type | Description | Photo |
|---|---|---|---|---|
| Albert Porter Pueblo (also called Hedrick Ruin) | Yellow Jacket, Montezuma, Colorado | Great house | Northern San Juan Pueblo ruins from AD 1000 to 1300. Added to the National Register of Historic Places in 1999 (#99000266). | |
| Castle Rock pueblo | | Great house | Ruins in southwestern Colorado. Includes the remains of at least 16 kivas, 40 surface rooms, nine possible towers, and a D-shaped enclosure. | |
| Shields pueblo | | | Ruins in southwestern Colorado. | |
| Woods Canyon Pueblo | Yellow Jacket, Montezuma, Colorado | Great house | Northern San Juan pueblo ruins from AD 1000 to 1300 consisting of as many as 200 rooms, 50 kivas, and 16 towers, and possibly a plaza. Added to the National Register of Historic Places in 1999 (#99000652). | |
| Yellow Jacket pueblo | Yellow Jacket, Montezuma, Colorado | Great house | Mesa Verde culture ruins from AD 1000 to 1300. Covering 100 acres, the pueblo contains at least 195 kivas (including a probable great kiva), 19 towers, a possible Chaco-era great house, and as many as 1,200 surface rooms. Added to the National Register of Historic Places in 1985 (#85002701). Site ID 5MT5. | |

== See also ==
- Anasazi State Park Museum
- Ancestral Puebloans

Other neighboring Ancient Pueblo sites in Colorado:

- Anasazi Heritage Center
- Canyons of the Ancients National Monument
- Hovenweep National Monument
- Mesa Verde National Park
- Ute Mountain Tribal Park in Mesa Verde
- Yucca House National Monument administered by the Mesa Verde National Park

Other cultures in the Four Corners region:

- Ancient dwellings of Pueblo peoples
- List of prehistoric sites in Colorado
- Trail of the Ancients
