= McElmo Creek =

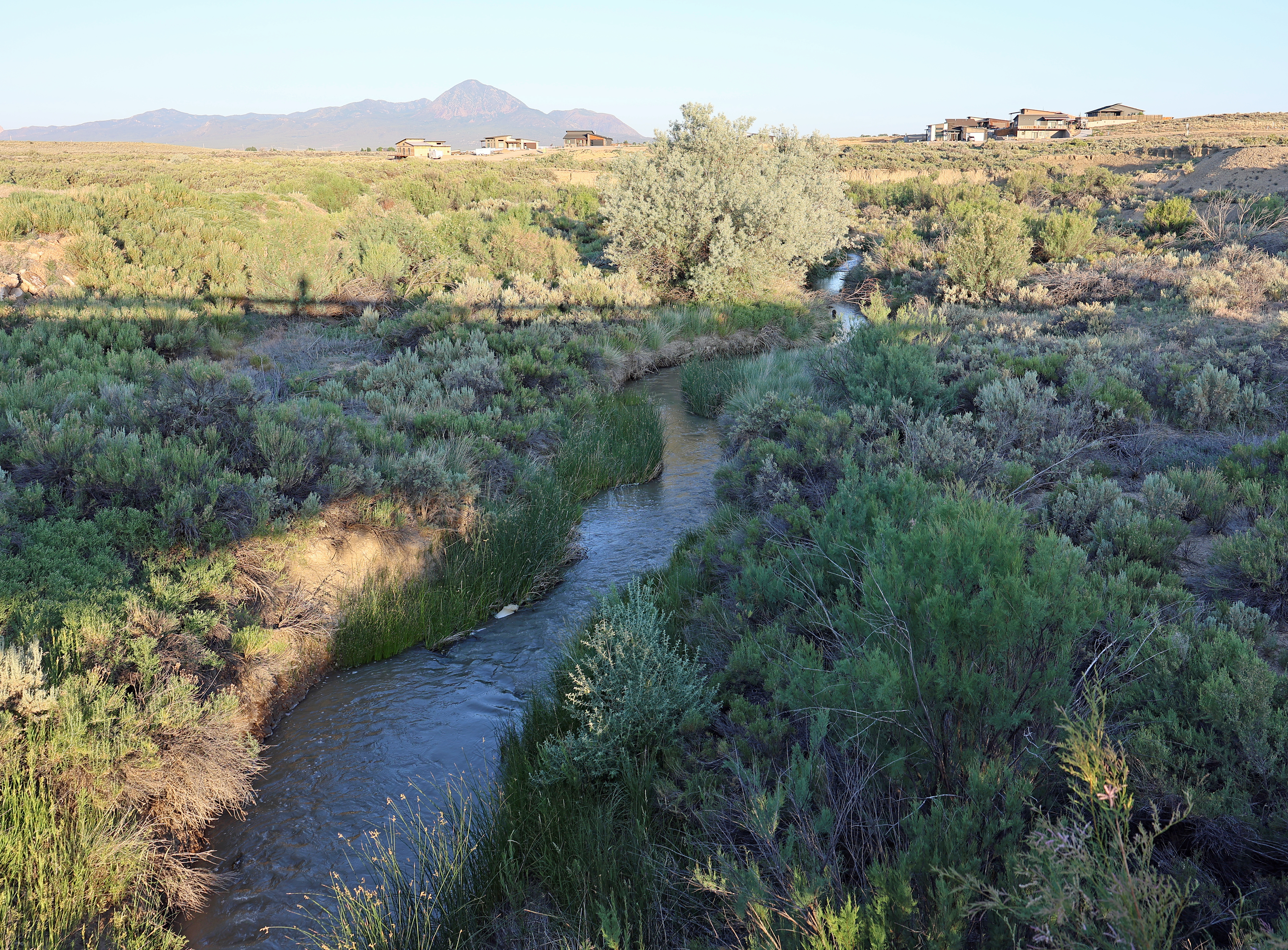
- McElmo Creek at a point south of Cortez

Physical characteristics
- Source
  - coordinates: 37°21′33″N 108°29′10″W
- Mouth
  - location: Confluence with San Juan
  - coordinates: 37°12′52″N 109°11′33″W
  - elevation: 4,462 ft (1,360 m)
- Basin size: 711 mi^{2} (1,840 km^{2})

Basin features
- Progression: San Juan—Colorado

McElmo Creek is a 70.1-mile-long (112.8 km) tributary that joins the San Juan River in San Juan County, Utah. The creek's source is just east of Cortez in Montezuma County, Colorado.

The flow in McElmo Creek increased after water was diverted out of the Dolores River just downstream of Dolores by the construction of the Montezuma Tunnel in 1889. The Montezuma Tunnel and the subsequent project, including Lake McPhee, irrigated the dry Montezuma Valley. This irrigation resulted in new water flows to McElmo Creek from flood irrigation wastewater, canal leakage, and sluicing and from higher groundwater levels.

The U.S. Fish and Wildlife Service installed a PIT antenna on McElmo Creek in 2012. The antenna monitors the movement of tagged endangered fishes.

== See also ==
- List of rivers of Colorado
- List of rivers of Utah
