= National Register of Historic Places listings in La Plata County, Colorado =

Location of La Plata County in Colorado

This is a list of the National Register of Historic Places listings in La Plata County, Colorado.

This is intended to be a complete list of the properties and districts on the National Register of Historic Places in La Plata County, Colorado, United States. The locations of National Register properties and districts for which the latitude and longitude coordinates are included below, may be seen in a map.

There are 15 properties and districts listed on the National Register in the county. One site was previously listed but has been delisted.

This National Park Service list is complete through NPS recent listings posted March 21, 2025.

== Current listings ==
	Name on the Register	Image	Date listed	Location	City or town	Description
1	Animas Canon Toll Road		March 27, 2017 (#100000787)	Between Durango and Silverton in the San Juan NF. 37°32′10″N 107°48′29″W	Durango	
2	Animas City School	Animas City School	April 23, 2019 (#100003687)	3065 W. 2nd Ave. 37°17′57″N 107°52′23″W	Durango	
3	Colorado Ute Power Plant	Colorado Ute Power Plant	September 29, 1983 (#83001323)	14th St. and the Animas River; 37°16′44″N 107°52′47″W	Durango	
4	Denver and Rio Grande Western Railroad Locomotive No. 315	Denver and Rio Grande Western Railroad Locomotive No. 315	October 24, 2008 (#08001008)	479 Main Ave. 37°16′05″N 107°52′57″W	Durango	
5	Durango High School	Durango High School	October 20, 2001 (#01001119)	201 E. 12th St. 37°16′36″N 107°52′39″W	Durango	
6	Durango Rock Shelters Archeology Site		February 11, 1985 (#85000260)	Address Restricted	Durango	
7	Durango-Silverton Narrow-Gauge Railroad	Durango-Silverton Narrow-Gauge Railroad	October 15, 1966 (#66000247)	Right-of-way between Durango and Silverton; 37°17′51″N 107°42′39″W	Durango	
8	East Third Avenue Historic Residential District	East Third Avenue Historic Residential District	October 11, 1984 (#84000024)	E. 3rd. Ave. between 5th and 15th Sts. 37°16′26″N 107°52′37″W	Durango	
9	Main Avenue Historic District	Main Avenue Historic District	August 7, 1980 (#80000907)	Main Ave. 37°16′23″N 107°52′48″W	Durango	
10	Newman Block	Newman Block	October 15, 1979 (#79000613)	801-813 Main Ave. 37°16′21″N 107°52′50″W	Durango	
11	Ochsner Hospital	Ochsner Hospital	May 4, 1995 (#95000534)	805 5th Ave. 37°16′16″N 107°52′30″W	Durango	
12	Rochester Hotel	Rochester Hotel	February 29, 1996 (#96000200)	726 E. 2nd Ave. 37°16′17″N 107°52′44″W	Durango	
13	Smiley Junior High School	Smiley Junior High School	November 27, 2002 (#02001462)	1309 E. 3rd Ave. 37°16′39″N 107°52′34″W	Durango	
14	Spring Creek Archeological District		May 21, 1983 (#83001322)	Address Restricted	Bayfield	
15	Ute Mountain Ute Mancos Canyon Historic District	Ute Mountain Ute Mancos Canyon Historic District	May 2, 1972 (#72000273)	Address Restricted	Durango	

== Former listing ==
	Name on the Register	Image	Date listed	Date removed	Location	City or town	Description
1	La Plata County Fairgrounds	La Plata County Fairgrounds	August 12, 1991 (#91001031)	July 23, 2001	2500 Main Ave. 37°17′33″N 107°52′22″W	Durango	Parts relocated or demolished in 1999 and 2000.

== See also ==
- List of National Historic Landmarks in Colorado
- List of National Register of Historic Places in Colorado
- Bibliography of Colorado
- Geography of Colorado
- History of Colorado
- Index of Colorado-related articles
- List of Colorado-related lists
- Outline of Colorado
