= John Benton (American football) =

American football player and coach (born 1963)

Seattle Seahawks
- Title: Senior offensive assistant & offensive line coach

Personal information
- Born: December 13, 1963 (age 62); Durango, Colorado, U.S.

Career information
- High school: Durango (CO)
- College: Colorado State (1983-1986)
- NFL draft: 1987: undrafted

Career history

Playing
- New Orleans Saints (1987)

Coaching
- Colorado State (1987–1989) Graduate assistant; California University (PA) (1990–1994) Offensive line coach & recruiting coordinator; Colorado State (1995–1999) Offensive line coach; Colorado State (2000–2003) Co-offensive coordinator & offensive line coach; St. Louis Rams (2004–2005) Offensive line coach; Houston Texans (2006–2013) Offensive line coach; Miami Dolphins (2014–2015) Offensive line coach; Jacksonville Jaguars (2016) Assistant offensive line coach; San Francisco 49ers (2017–2020) Offensive line coach; New York Jets (2021–2022) Offensive line coach & run game coordinator; New Orleans Saints (2024) Offensive line coach; Seattle Seahawks (2025) Offensive line coach; Seattle Seahawks (2026–present) Senior offensive assistant & offensive line coach

Awards and highlights
- Super Bowl champion (LX)

John Benton (born December 13, 1963) is an American professional football coach who is the senior offensive assistant and offensive line coach for the Seattle Seahawks of the National Football League (NFL). He previously served as an assistant coach for the New York Jets, San Francisco 49ers, Jacksonville Jaguars, Miami Dolphins, Houston Texans, St. Louis Rams, and New Orleans Saints.

== College career ==
Benton attended Colorado State University (CSU), where he played for the Colorado State Rams football team. He earned honorable mention All-WAC honors during his junior and senior seasons and was named to the WAC's All-Academic team as a senior. He was also named to the Colorado State University Football All Century Team for the years 1893–1993.

== Coaching career ==
=== Miami Dolphins ===
In 2014 and 2015 he worked as the offensive line coach for the Dolphins.

=== Jacksonville Jaguars ===
In 2016 Benton coached with the Jaguars.

=== San Francisco 49ers ===
Benton was hired by the San Francisco 49ers as their offensive line coach in February 2017. He tested positive for COVID-19 and missed the team's week 14 game in 2020 against the Washington Football Team.

=== New York Jets ===
In January 2021, Benton was hired by the New York Jets as their offensive line coach.

=== New Orleans Saints ===
In February 2024, Benton was named as offensive line coach for the New Orleans Saints.

=== Seattle Seahawks ===
On February 3, 2025, the Seattle Seahawks hired Benton as their offensive line coach. He won his first Super Bowl championship as part of the coaching staff that won Super Bowl LX over the New England Patriots 29–13. After the season, he was promoted to senior offensive assistant & offensive line coach.
