= Rocky Mountain Chocolate =

American confectionery company

Rocky Mountain Chocolate, Inc.
- Type: Public
- Traded as: Nasdaq: RMCF; Russell Microcap Index component
- Industry: Chocolate and other confectionery
- Founded: 1981; 45 years ago
- Headquarters: Durango, Colorado, United States
- Number of locations: 323 (2022)
- Key people: Robert J. Sarlls (CEO); Allen Arroyo (CFO); Jeff Geygan (chair)
- Revenue: ▼US$27.5 million (2025)
- Net income: ▲ −US$4.56 million (2025)
- Number of employees: 217 (2022)
- Website: rmcf.com

Rocky Mountain Chocolate, formerly Rocky Mountain Chocolate Factory, Inc., is an international franchiser, confectionery manufacturer and retail operator in the United States, with outlets in Panama and the Philippines. The company is based in the town of Durango, Colorado, United States of America.

The company manufactures chocolate candies and other confections in its 53,000-square-foot (4,900 m^{2}) production facility to supply its franchise locations. The facility produces approximately 300 different types of chocolate candies and other confectionery products. These products include many varieties of clusters, caramels, creams, meltaways, truffles and molded chocolates.

The company has been publicly traded on the NASDAQ exchange since 1985 under the symbol "RMCF".

== History ==
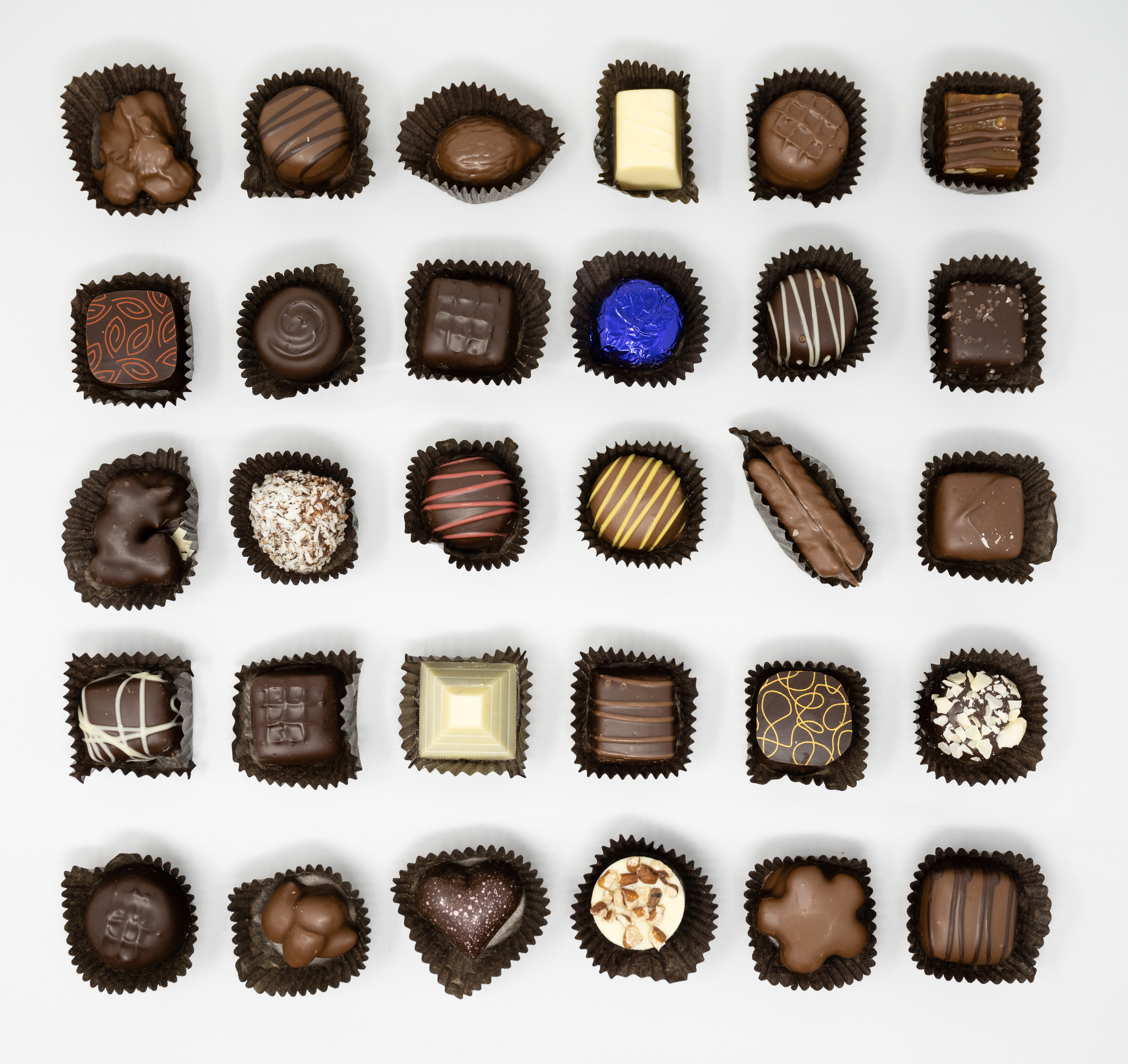
Chocolates made by Rocky Mountain Chocolate

The company was founded by Frank Crail with his friends Jim Hilton and Mark Lipinski. They opened their first store on May 23, 1981, on Main Avenue in Durango's Historic District adjacent to the Durango and Silverton Narrow Gauge Railroad. In 1982, both Hilton and Lipinski left the business, selling their interests to Crail. An offsite facility in the Bodo Industrial District of Durango was built that same year, with the company also opening their first franchises, one in Colorado Springs, Colorado and one in Park City, Utah.

In 2013, Kellogg's in the United States partnered with the Rocky Mountain Chocolate to release a limited edition cereal under the latter's brand which consists of sweetened corn flakes, almond slices, and chocolate pieces.

In 2022 Rocky Mountain Chocolate was named America's Best Chocolate and Candy Store by Newsweek.

In 2023 Rocky Mountain Chocolate divested itself of all assets and marks pertaining to its activity as a marketer and franchisor of a number of frozen yogurt brands held in its U-Swirl, Inc. subsidiary.

In September 2023, Rocky Mountain Chocolate Factory announced that it would remove the word "factory" from its name, rebranding to Rocky Mountain Chocolate.
