= Carver Willis =

American football player (born 2002)

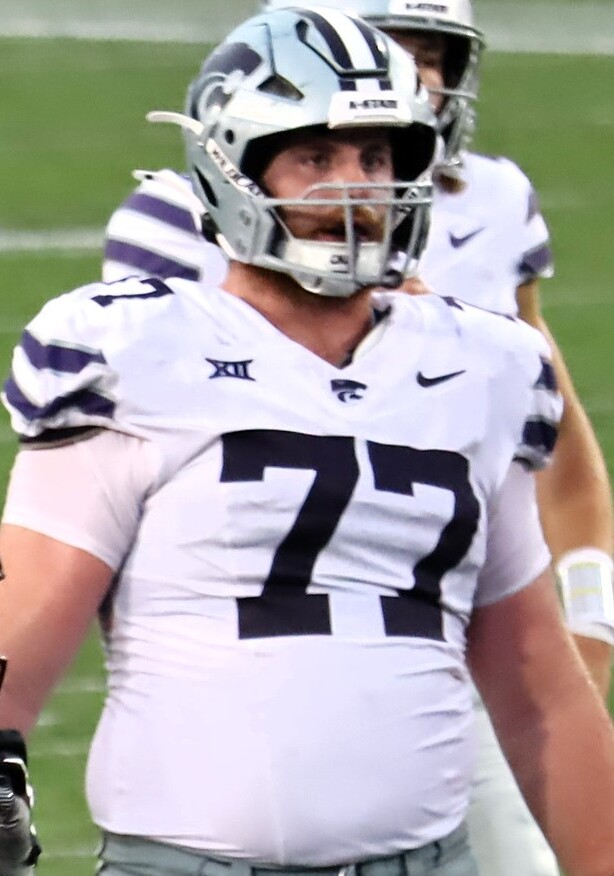

No. 74 – San Francisco 49ers
- Position: Guard
- Roster status: Active

Personal information
- Born: April 20, 2002 (age 24); Llano, Texas, U.S.
- Listed height: 6 ft 5 in (1.96 m)
- Listed weight: 303 lb (137 kg)

Career information
- High school: Durango (Durango, Colorado)
- College: Kansas State (2020–2024); Washington (2025)
- NFL draft: 2026: 4th round, 127th overall pick

Career history
- San Francisco 49ers (2026–present)

Career NFL statistics as of Week 4, 2026
- Games played: 4
- Stats at Pro Football Reference

Carver Willis (born April 20, 2002) is an American professional football guard for the San Francisco 49ers of the National Football League (NFL). He played college football for the Kansas State Wildcats and the Washington Huskies and was selected by the 49ers in the fourth round of the 2026 NFL draft.

== Early life ==
Willis was born on April 22, 2002, in Llano, Texas. He attended Durango High School in Durango, Colorado. During his senior season, he earned Class 3A first team all-state honors. Coming out of high school, Willis committed to play college football for the Kansas State Wildcats over offers from other schools such as Colorado State, Kansas, New Mexico State, Northern Colorado, and Wyoming.

== College career ==
=== Kansas State ===
Willis played 11 games from 2020 to 2022 and took a redshirt in 2021. He entered the 2023 season as the team's starting right tackle after starter Christian Duffie went down with an injury in preseason camp. Willis appeared in 13 games that year, with seven starts. In 2024, he made ten starts for the Wildcats at right tackle and entered the NCAA transfer portal after the season.

=== Washington ===
Willis transferred to play for the Washington Huskies. He entered the 2025 season as the starting left tackle for the Huskies. Willis started ten games and declared for the NFL draft after the season, while also accepting an invite to the 2026 Senior Bowl.

== Professional career ==
Pre-draft measurables
Height	Weight	Arm length	Hand span	Wingspan	40-yard dash	10-yard split	20-yard split	20-yard shuttle	Vertical jump	Broad jump	Bench press
6 ft 5 in (1.96 m)	303 lb (137 kg)	32 1/2 in (0.83 m)	9 1/2 in (0.24 m)	6 ft 7 in (2.01 m)	5.11 s	1.84 s	3.00 s	4.71 s	26.5 in (0.67 m)	9 ft 0 in (2.74 m)	23 reps
All values from NFL Combine/Pro Day

Willis was selected by the San Francisco 49ers in the fourth round with the 127th overall pick of the 2026 NFL draft. On May 8, he signed his rookie deal with the 49ers.
