= Durango High School =

Durango High School may refer to:

- Durango High School (Colorado) in Durango, Colorado
- Durango High School (Nevada) in Las Vegas, Nevada
