= Rochester Hotel =

- U.S. National Register of Historic Places
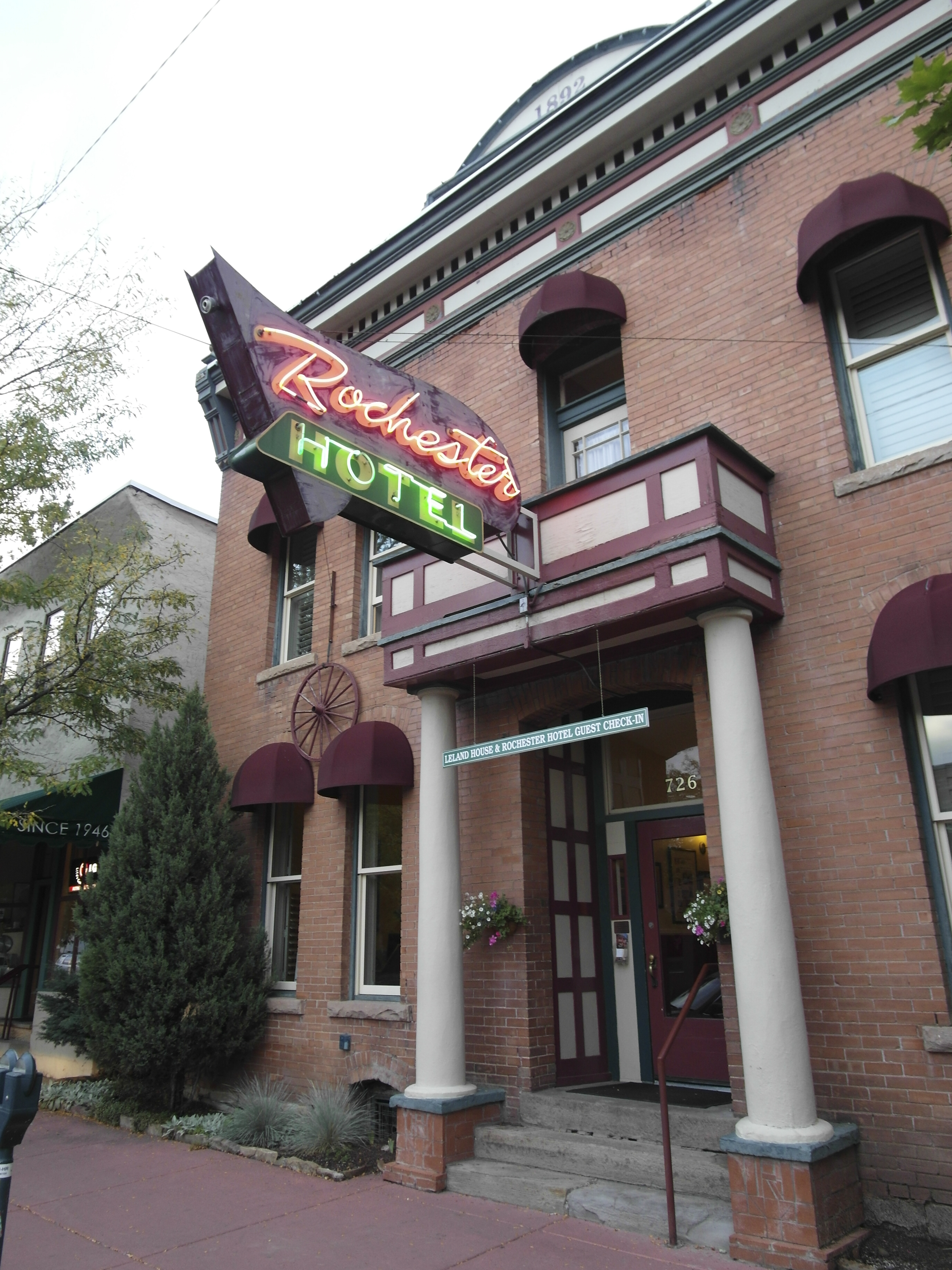

- Location within Colorado Location within the United States
- Location: 726 E. Second Ave., Durango, Colorado
- Coordinates: 37°16′17″N 107°52′44″W
- Area: less than one acre
- Built: 1890-92, 1909
- Architectural style: Late 19th And 20th Century Revivals
- MPS: Rural School Buildings in Colorado MPS
- NRHP reference No.: 96000200
- Added to NRHP: February 29, 1996

The Rochester Hotel, at 726 E. Second Ave. in Durango, Colorado, was built in 1892. It was listed on the National Register of Historic Places in 1996.

Its construction was begun in 1890. E.T. Peeples took over construction in 1891. It was completed in 1892 by new owners J.E. Schutt and W.C. Chapman.
