= Strater Hotel =

- U.S. Historic district – Contributing property
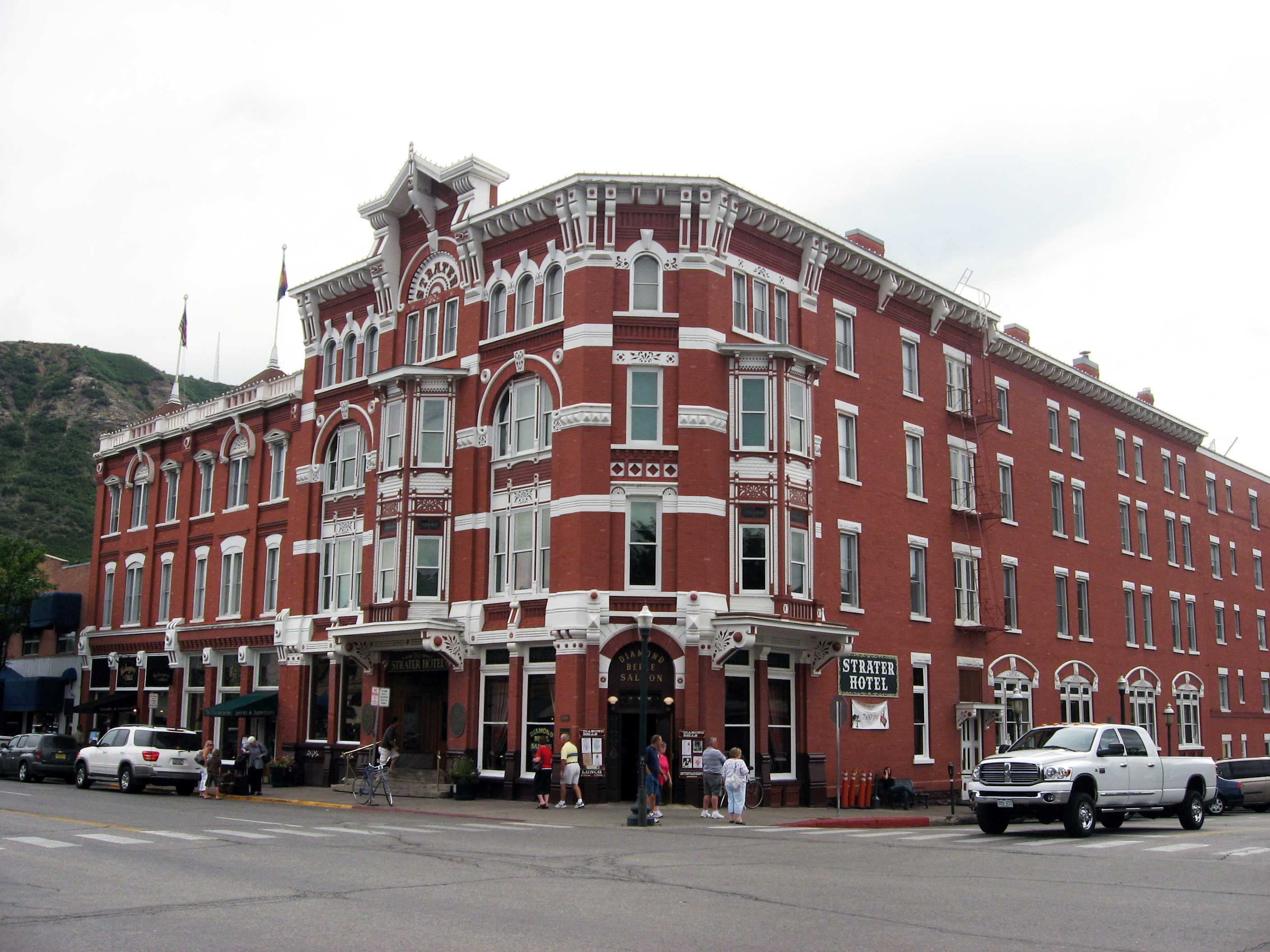
- The Strater Hotel in 2010

- Location within Colorado Location within the United States
- Location: Main Ave., Durango, Colorado
- Coordinates: 37.271119°N 107.881799°W
- Built: 1887
- Architectural style: Late Victorian
- Part of: Main Avenue Historic District (ID80000907)
- Designated CP: August 7, 1980

The Strater Hotel, in Durango, Colorado, is a historical hotel that opened in 1887 at the height of the American Gilded Age. Among its notable guests throughout its history are President Gerald Ford, Will Rogers, writer Louis L’Amour, the Grateful Dead, and astronauts from the Apollo missions.

It has been a charter member of the National Registry of the Historic Hotels of America since 1989. The Strater is listed on the National Register of Historic Places as a contributing building in Durango's Main Avenue Historic District. It was named a national literary historical landmark in 2012 by the Association of Library Trustees, Advocates, Friends and Foundations. The hotel's Diamond Belle bar saloon features bartenders and waitresses who are dressed in historic costume.

== History ==
The hotel was originally built by the Strater family, who moved to Durango from Cleveland between 1880 and 1881. Specifically, the hotel was the brainchild of Henry Strater, a pharmacist who rallied his brothers and father to help construct the hotel at the cost of $70,000. Strater kept his pharmacy in the corner of the hotel, while delegating the management to H. L. Rice, who elevated the social scene at the hotel. Strater eventually opened up a rival Columbian Hotel after he became furious at the high rents that Rice was charging him for the pharmacy located in the corner of the Strater hotel.

The hotel went bankrupt in 1895 with the financial Panic of 1893 and was repossessed by the Bank of Cleveland. The property was then leased to Hattie Mashburn and Charles E. Stilwell.

During the Roaring Twenties, a group of Durango businessmen led by Earl A. Barker Sr. formed a consortium to buy the then aging hotel in 1926.

Western author Louis L’Amour, who stayed in Durango with his family, always asked for room 222, located directly above the Diamond Belle Saloon; he said that the honky-tonk music helped set the mood for his novels of the Old West. A number of L’Amour's Sackett series novels were written at the Strater. As a result, room 222 is known today as the Louis L’Amour room.

=== Original Design ===
The hotel's architectural style, originally created by Paul Geier, is an eclectic mixture of forms, primarily Italian Romanesque and Renaissance Revival.

In an era before indoor plumbing, the rooms’ washstands also housed the chamber pots which were emptied each morning by the maids. The hotel also boasted a strategically designed three-story privy.

=== Later Changes ===
In 1981, under his family's ownership, Roderick Earl Barker returned to his home town to renovate and operate the hotel. Under his direction and later his ownership (1981-2020), the Strater Hotel was further developed such that it had 3 restaurants, a construction and interior design company, a theatre, and a catering company.

During the period 1985 to 2015, Rod and his hotel company put over $11,000,000 into the property renovation. Rod's lead craftsman, Charles E Schumacher, was a painter, wallpaper hanger, and a woodworker.

Among the results of the Barker-Schumacher collaboration is the Office “Spiritorium,” where a high Victorian bar was established to rival those in larger cities like Denver or San Francisco. In that room alone, over $1,000,000 was spent on the finish and infrastructure.

Another notable result of this collaboration is the Mahogany Grille restaurant. In this room, there are two large stained glass domes installed on the ceiling. The dome on the west side was purchased in the liquidation sale of Durango’s Old Muldoon bar, and the other was crafted as an exact replica by Strater craftsman Mike Mitchell.

Other renovated areas include the Pullman and Centennial Rooms, the hotel lobby, and some of the hotel's hidden passageways and secret hiding places.

Not all of the hotel's top level renovations are in the public eye, as is evidenced by its energy star rated boiler room. Here, Barker and his team led by Strater craftsman Josh Wolf utilized the waste heat generated by the air cooling system to heat the domestic hot water system through a series of heat exchangers and a 5,000 gallon underground hot water storage tank. This system was later refined to help reduce the nearly 6,000,000 BTUs from two large natural gas powered boilers to one, 2,000,000 BTU highly efficient unit that provided all the heating needed.

== Current Attractions ==
The hotel hosts a notable collection of American Victorian Walnut antiques that fills the hotel and its 88 rooms.

The hotel's Diamond Belle Saloon, presents live music on its upright grand piano. Ragtime musicians including Adam Swanson, Johnny Maddox, Terry Hartzel, and others have performed here.
