= Main Avenue Historic District (Durango, Colorado) =

Historic district in Colorado, United States

- U.S. National Register of Historic Places
- U.S. Historic district
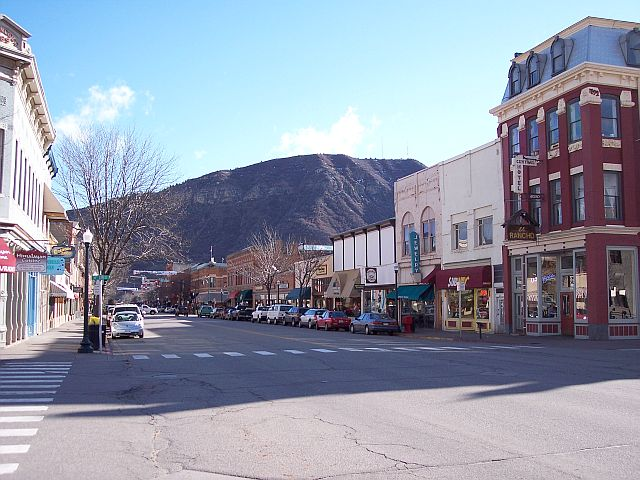

- Location within Colorado Location within the United States
- Location: Main Ave., Durango, Colorado
- Coordinates: 37°16′23″N 107°52′48″W
- Area: 34 acres (14 ha)
- Architectural style: Late 19th And 20th Century Revivals, Late Victorian
- NRHP reference No.: 80000907
- Added to NRHP: August 7, 1980

Main Avenue Historic District in Durango, Colorado is a 34-acre (14 ha) historic district that was listed on the National Register of Historic Places in 1980.

According to its 1980 NRHP nomination, it was deemed significant "because it represents the essence and core of both the evolution and development of business and commerce in the most important town in southwestern Colorado."

In 1980 it included 104 buildings: 86 buildings deemed to contribute to the historic character of the area, 12 non-contributing but compatible modern buildings, and 6 negative intrusions. It was felt that "together these buildings still maintain the feelings, associations, and ambiance of a turn-of-the-century commercial district."

The ten buildings then deemed most important are: (on the odd side)

- Gold Slipper (1900), 645 Main, originally built as an Adolph Coors bottling plant
- Wetter Mercantile, 605 main, oldest building on the block. Built 1883 Ernest Wetter keep his store here 1903-late 1930s.
- Strater Hotel (1887), 699 Main, an architecturally eclectic Victorian four-story building
- Main Mall, 835 Main, a modern building designed compatibly which holds about 35 businesses, which replaced several buildings destroyed in a 1975 fire.
- Newman Block (1897), at 801-813 Main Ave., which was separately listed on the NRHP in 1979.
- Gardenswartz Building (1901), 871 Main
- Central Hotel (1899), 975 Main
- Main Street Furnishings (1889), 1015 Main

and on the even side

- Burns Bank (1892), 900 Main
- Old Post Office Building (1928), 1090-8 Main

Others include:

- Palmer House hotel
- First National Bank (1892), 901 Main Ave.
- Woolworths (1859)
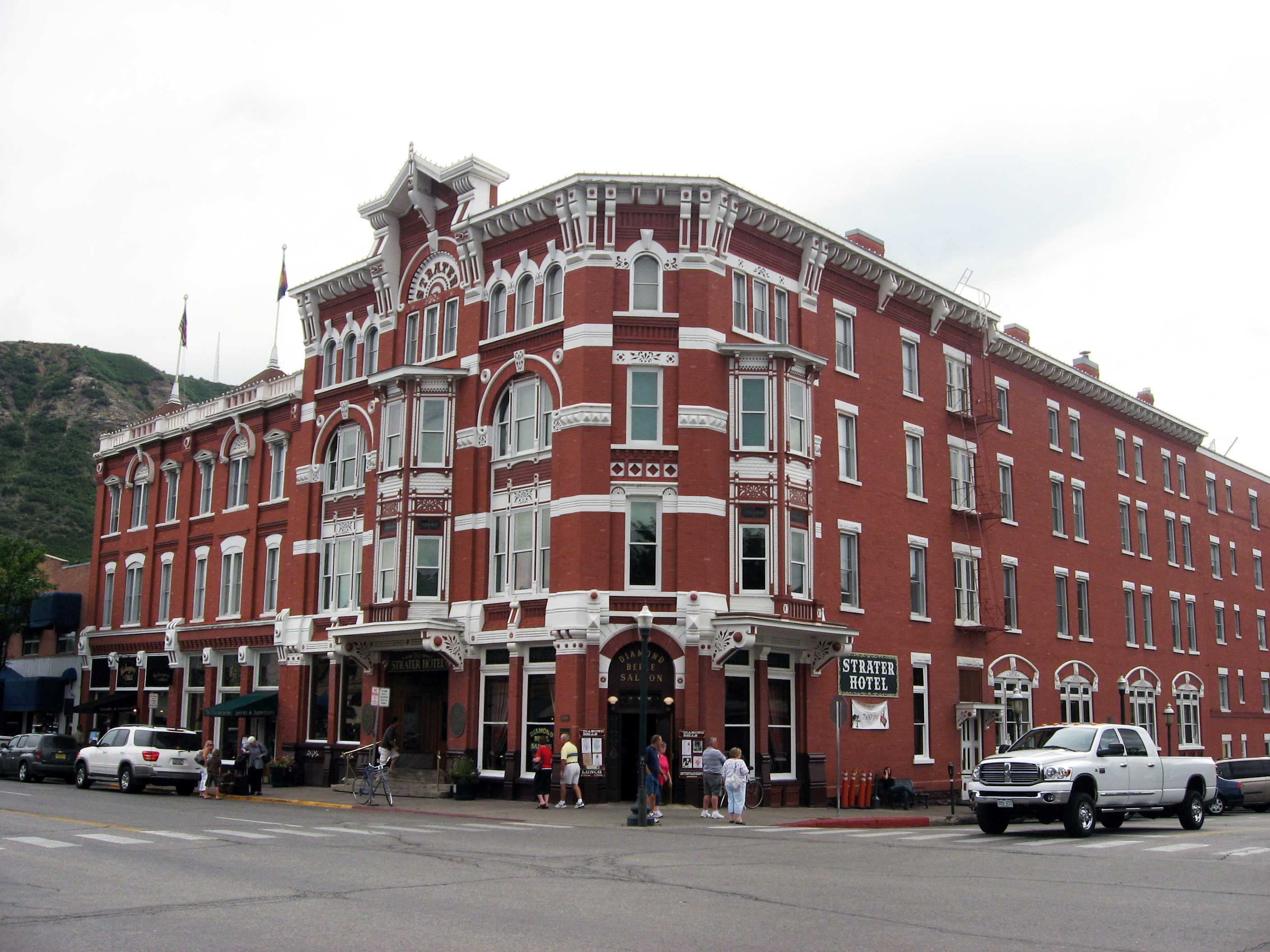
Strater Hotel, in 2010

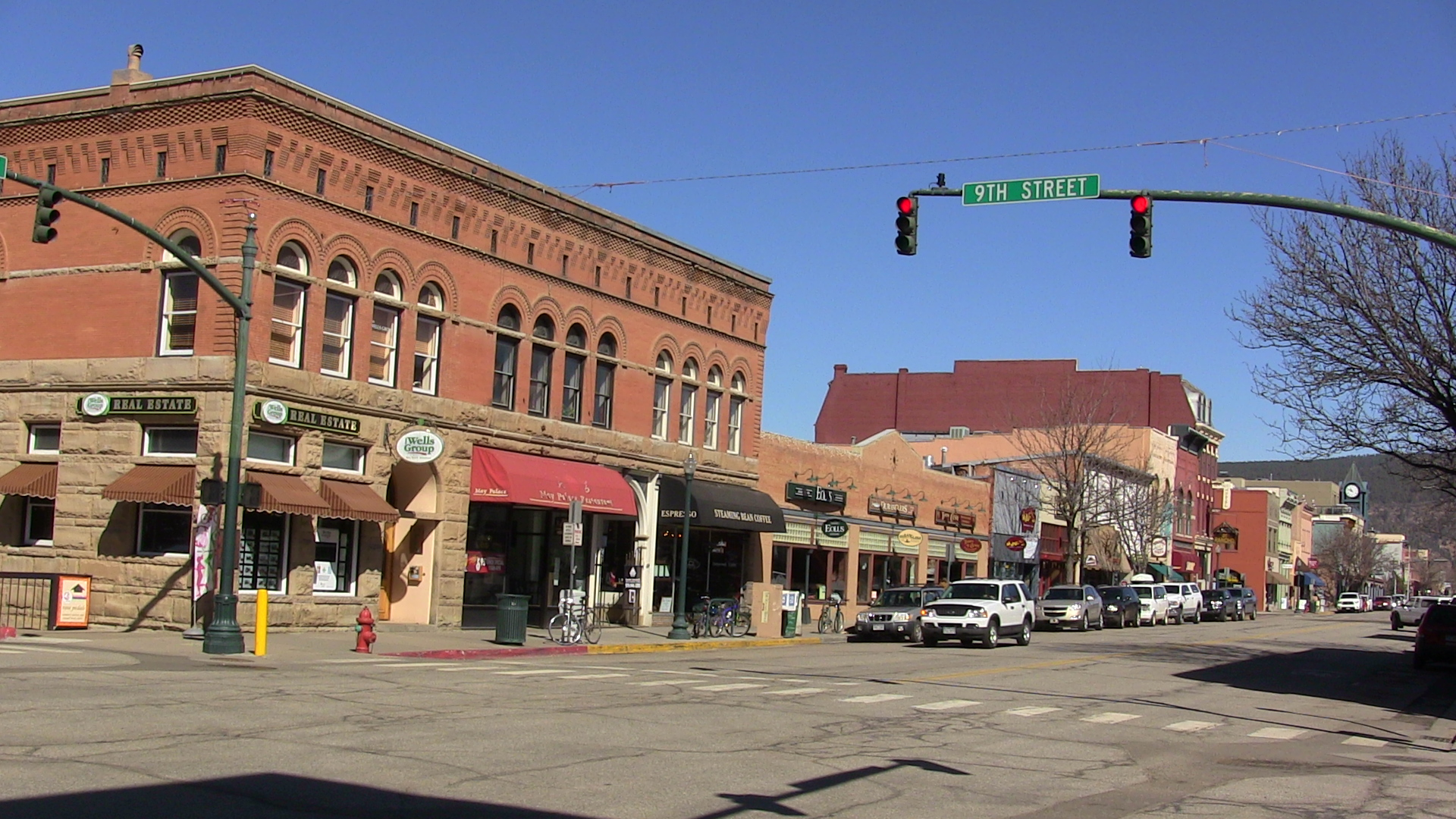
2014

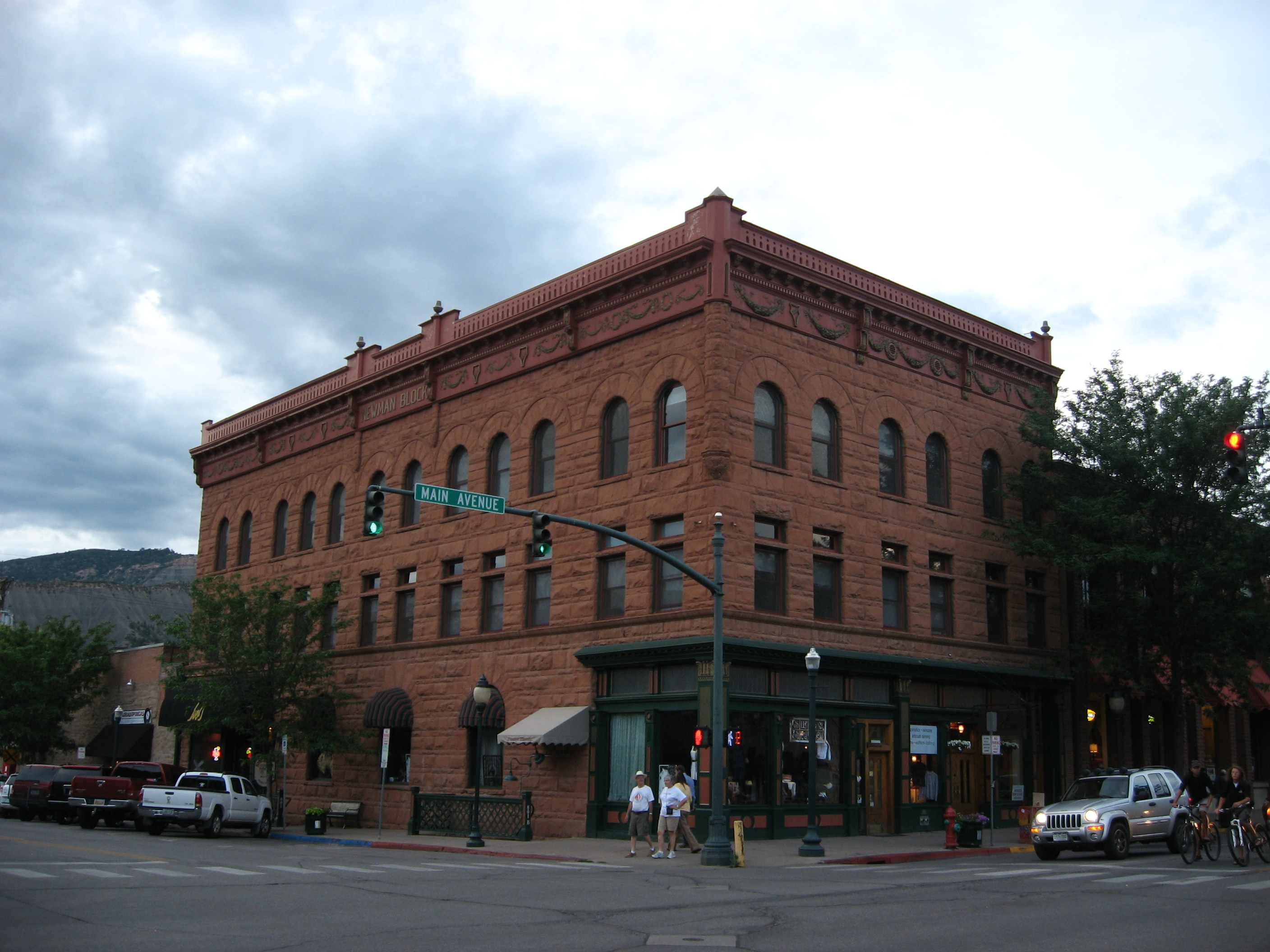
Newman Block
