= Durango High School (Colorado) =

Public high school in Durango, Colorado

Location
- 2390 Main Avenue; Durango, Colorado 81301; United States; 37°17′20″N 107°52′24″W

Information
- School type: Public high school
- Established: 1917 (109 years ago)
- School district: Durango 9-R
- CEEB code: 060479
- NCES School ID: 080348000448
- Principal: Jonathan Hoerl
- Teaching staff: 81.54 (on an FTE basis)
- Grades: 9–12
- Enrollment: 1,343 (2023–2024)
- Student to teacher ratio: 16.47
- Colors: Red and white
- Athletics conference: CHSAA
- Mascot: Demon
- Website: dhs.durangoschools.org
- Durango High School
- U.S. National Register of Historic Places
- Colorado State Register of Historic Properties
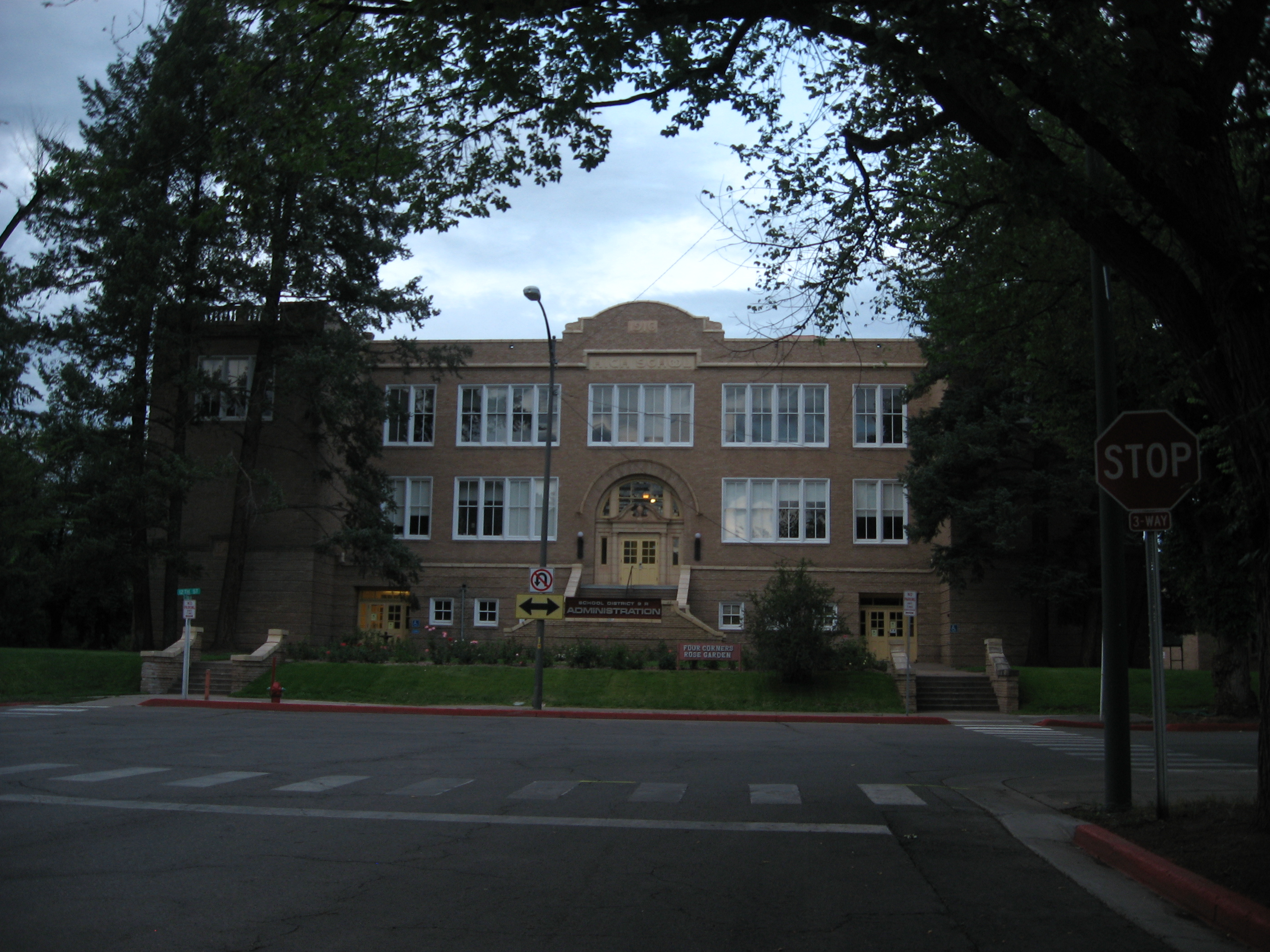
- Building in 2010

- Location within Colorado
- Location: 201 East 12th Street; Durango, Colorado
- Coordinates: 37.2768°N 107.8781°W
- Architect: Thomas MacLaren and Charles Thomas
- NRHP reference No.: 01001119
Significant dates
- Added to NRHP: October 20, 2001
- Designated CSRHP: August 8, 2001

Durango High School is a public high school in Durango, Colorado, United States. The school's historic building, now the district's administrative building, is listed on the National Register of Historic Places and the Colorado State Register of Historic Properties. The building opened in 1917, and served as a high school until it became the district administration building in 1976.

== History ==
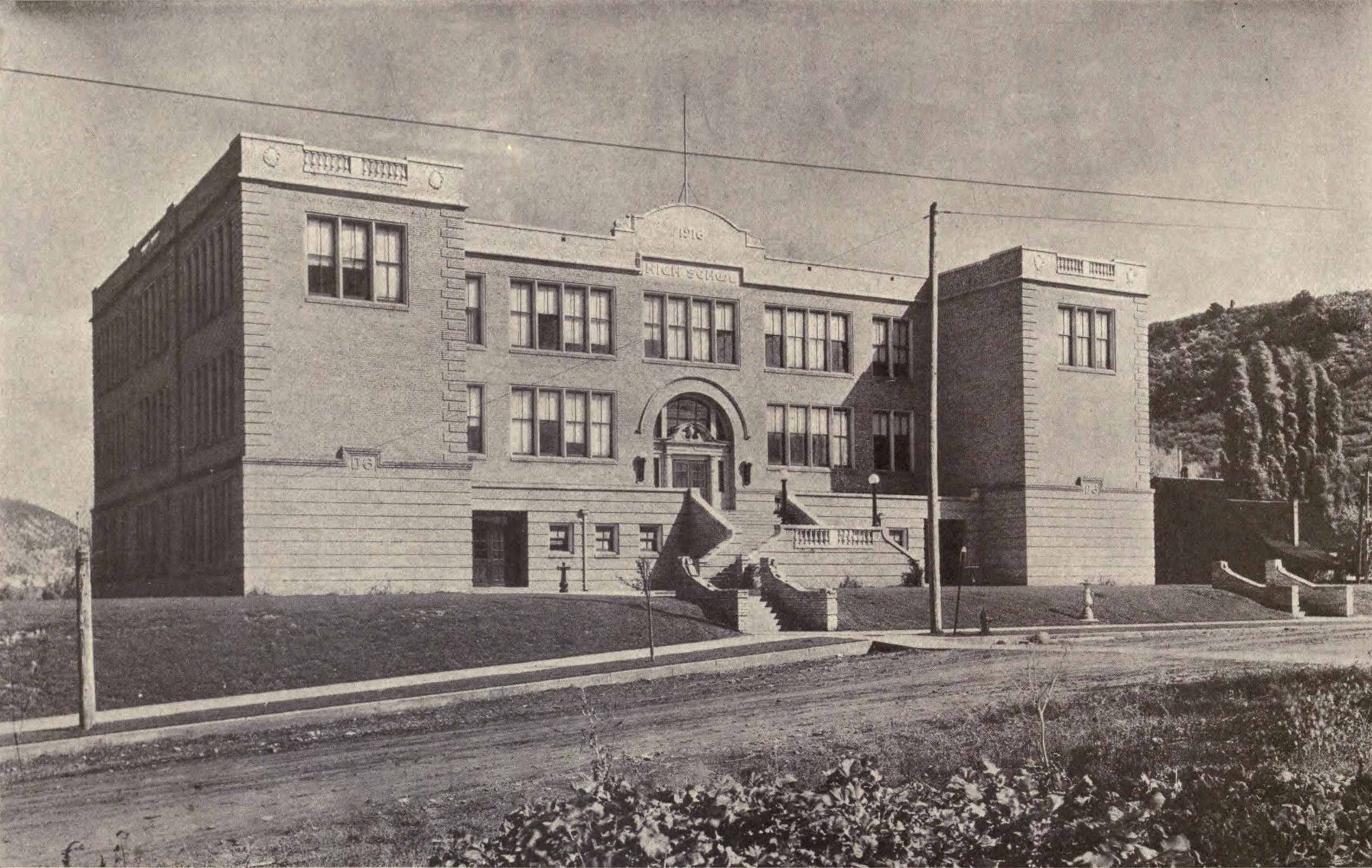
The recently built Durango High School, circa 1920

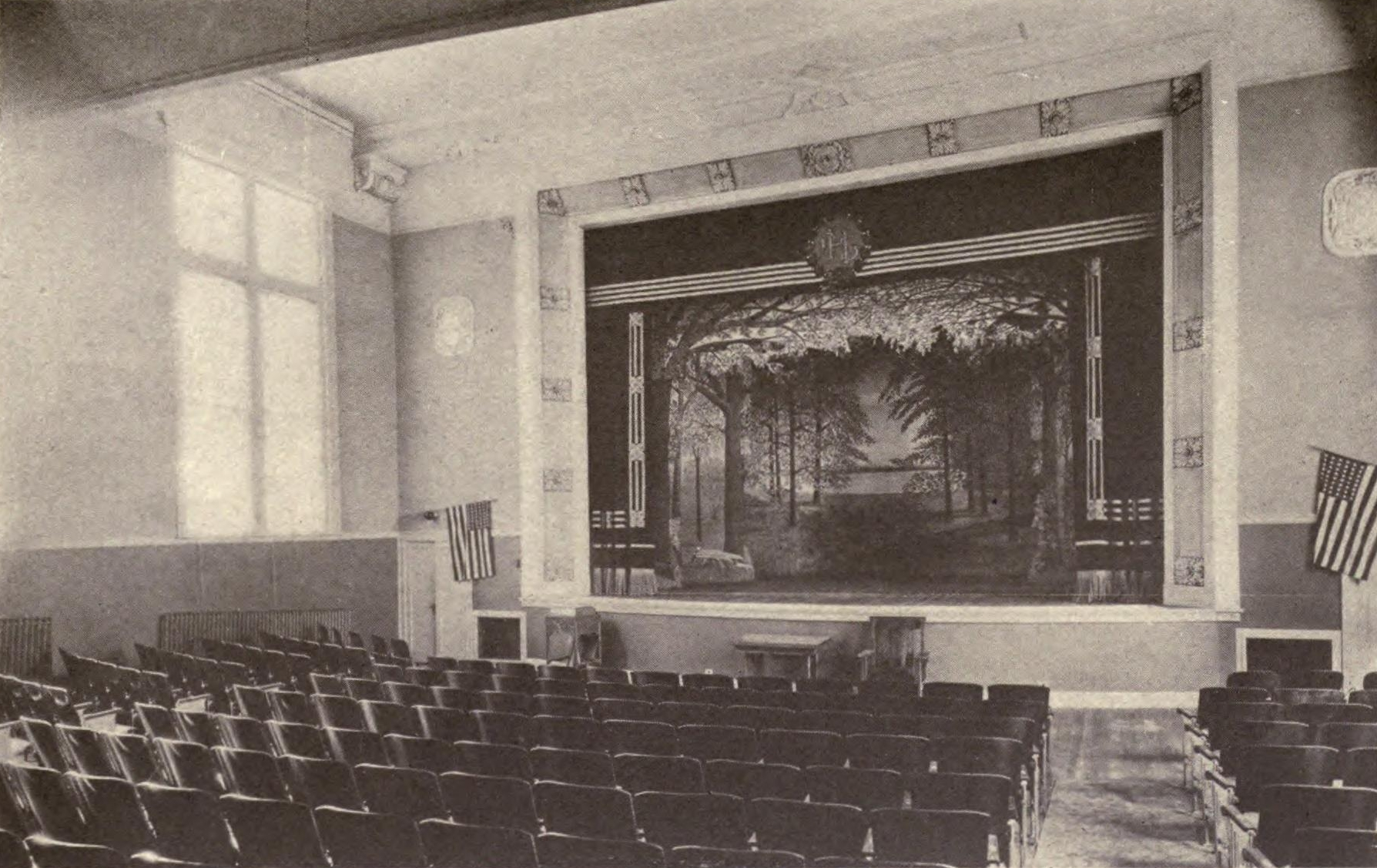
Auditorium circa 1920

Durango's first high school opened in 1893. By early 1914, the school had problems with overcrowding, so plans were drawn up for a new building. The chosen site was between 12th and 13th Streets along East 2nd Avenue, and existing property owners were willing to sell. The optimal location for the building happened to be directly in the 2nd Avenue right-of-way, so the city abandoned the road and an alley in the 12th–13th Street block. A $175,000 bond for construction of the new building passed in 1916 with a vote of 238 to 199. The building was designed by architectural firm Thomas MacLaren and Charles Thomas and M.J. Kenney served as contractor. The Durango High School was one of the last projects that MacLaren and Thomas collaborated on before their partnership dissolved on April 4, 1917. Without equipment, the structure cost an estimated $165,000. The new school opened in September 1917 with 304 students; the former high school became a junior high school, and then an elementary school in 1937, and it burned down in 1950.

In mid-1918, as a result of World War I, German classes were dropped from the curriculum and German texts were burned. On October 17, 1918, Spanish influenza forced the closure of the school, and it did not reopen until January 6, 1919.

By the 1970s, Durango's population growth meant that the high school, designed for up to 500 students, could not accommodate a projected 700 students. Construction on a new school began in 1975, and it opened in 1976. The historic Durango High School became an administration building for the Durango 9-R School District, serving all administrative roles for the district including school board meetings. Renovation of the former school was directed by architect Michael R. Bell.

Durango High School was added to the Colorado State Register of Historic Properties on August 8, 2001. The school was nominated for inclusion on the National Register of Historic Places under Criterion A for its role in education and Criterion C for its significance in architecture. It was added to the Register on October 20, 2001.

== Academics ==
With a commitment to cultivating as much growth as possible, each graduate completes 27 credits (meeting the requirement of 4 year colleges). Utilizing a weighted carnegie unit system, a semester-long class counts for 0.5 credit and a year-long class counts for 1 credit. The GPA of each student is determined by a weighted system in which an 'A' in a weighted class is given a value of 5.0 on a 4.0 scale, a 'B' in such class is given a 4.0 on the same scale, and so forth. In this manner, a student's GPA can exceed the traditional 4.0. As of 2016, there were 16 different Advanced Placement courses offered.

== Original Building Architecture and use ==
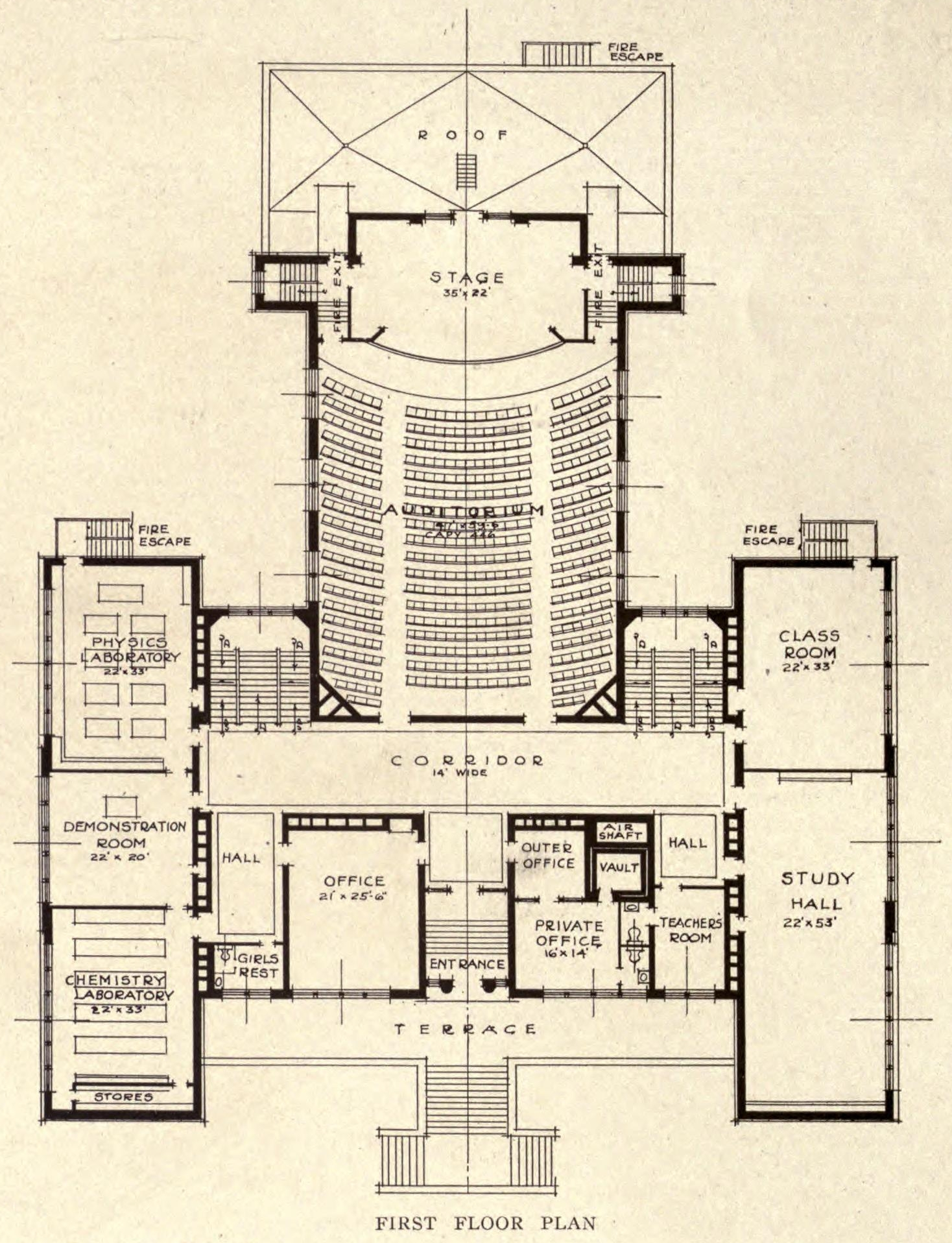
Plan of the school building's first floor, showing its overall inverted "T" shape

The Durango High School building was designed in the Classical Revival style, intended to accommodate 500 students. The building layout was based on a standard "H" shape, to which was added a wing housing the gym and auditorium, resulting in an inverted "T" shape. At the time of construction, Durango lacked a theater or public assembly hall, so the auditorium was built with the intent that it be used by the community and school.

The building is three stories tall with basement except along the north side where it is only one story. It is built of buff-colored, smooth-faced brick. The building features corner quoining and terra cotta trim, and is one of only two buildings in Durango to feature terra cotta ornamentation. At the top of the building's front is an arched parapet bearing a terra cotta plaque which reads "1916", above a rectangular plaque which reads "High School". On the east and west wings are two plaques which read "DHS". At the front of the building is a garden maintained by the Four Corners Rose Society.

The building's exterior has remained largely unchanged, except for an addition at the rear of the building when the plunge pool became a swimming pool in 1927. The interior changed significantly during renovations in 1977–1978 when the school became the district administration building. Classrooms were modified with dropped ceilings and new lighting; the auditorium became a large, level-floored meeting room; and the swimming pool was covered over and became a storage area.

== Notable alumni ==
- Carver Willis, college football offensive lineman for the Washington Huskies

== See also ==
- National Register of Historic Places listings in La Plata County, Colorado
