= Durango, Colorado =

City in Colorado, US

- Home rule city
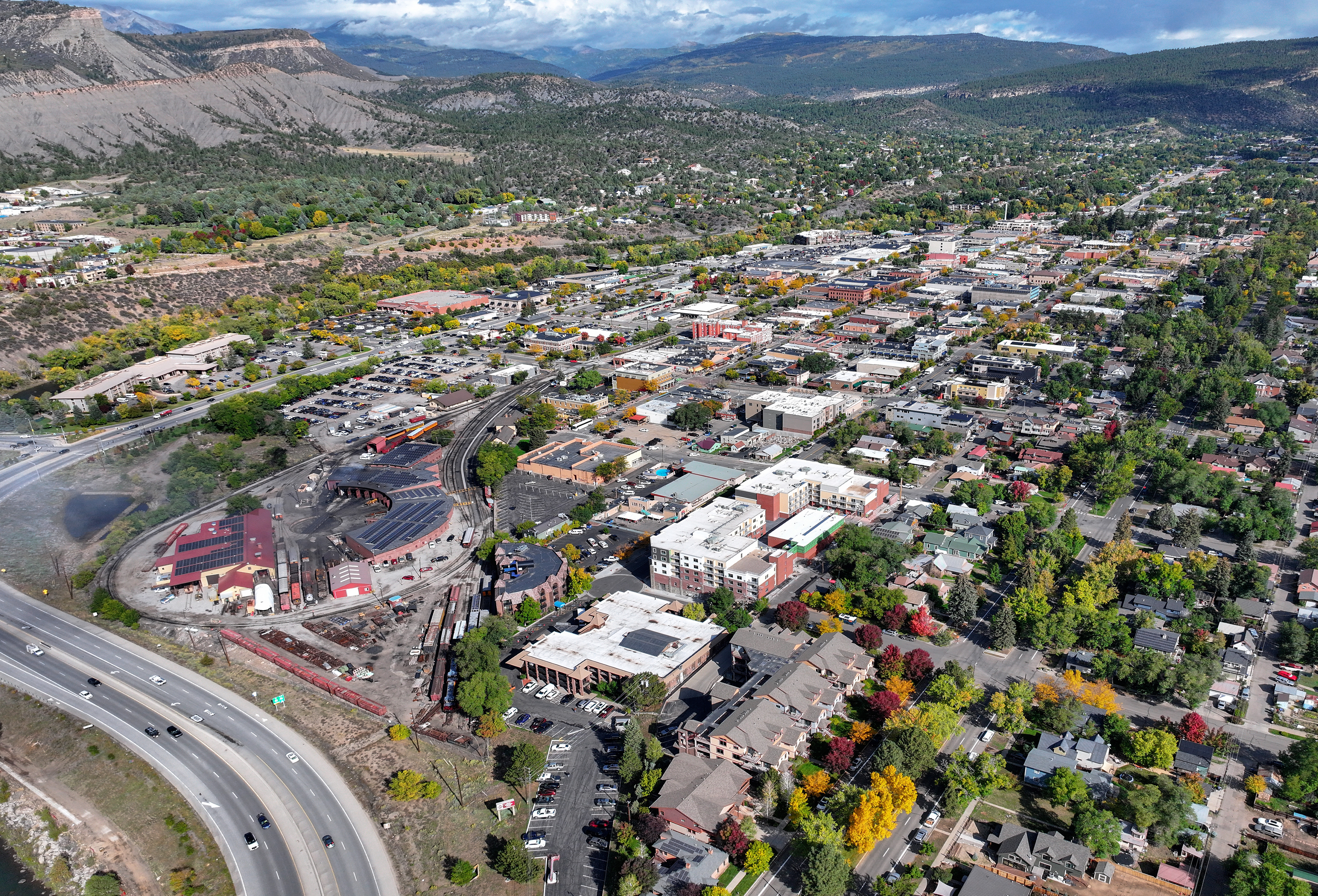
- Aerial view (2025)

- Flag

- Location within La Plata County and Colorado
- Coordinates: 37.2752°N 107.8801°W
- Country: United States
- State: Colorado
- County: La Plata
- Founded: 1880
- Incorporated: April 27, 1881

Government
  - Type: Home rule city

Area
  - Home rule city: 17.103 sq mi (44.296 km^{2})
  - Land: 14.708 sq mi (38.093 km^{2})
  - Water: 2.395 sq mi (6.203 km^{2})
- Elevation: 6,532 ft (1,991 m)

Population (2020)
  - Home rule city: 19,071
  - Density: 1,296.7/sq mi (500.64/km^{2})
  - Metro: 55,638
- Time zone: UTC−07:00 (MST)
  - Summer (DST): UTC−06:00 (MDT)
- ZIP Codes: 81301-81303
- Area codes: 970/748
- GNIS place ID: 202983
- GNIS city ID: 2410374
- FIPS code: 08-22035
- Website: durangoco.gov

Durango is the home rule city and the county seat of La Plata County, Colorado, United States. The city's population was 19,071 at the 2020 census, making it the most populous city in the county. Durango is the home of Fort Lewis College.

== History ==
Durango was initially inhabited by members of the Ute Native American tribe.

The town was organized from September 1880 to April 1881 by the Denver and Rio Grande Railroad (D&RG, later known as the Denver and Rio Grande Western railroad) as part of their efforts to reach Silverton, Colorado, and service the San Juan mining district, the goal of their "San Juan Extension" built from Alamosa, Colorado. The D&RG chose a site in the Animas Valley close to the Animas River near what is now the Downtown Durango Historic Business District for its railroad facilities following a brief and most likely perfunctory negotiation with the other establishment in the area known as Animas City, two miles (3.2 km) to the north. The city was named by ex-Colorado Governor Alexander C. Hunt, a friend of D&RG President William Jackson Palmer, after Durango, Mexico, based on his favorable impression of that city resulting from a scouting trip undertaken on behalf of Palmer.

The Durango, Colorado, post office opened on November 19, 1880, and the Town of Durango was incorporated on April 27, 1881.

Palmer, among other D&RG associates such as William Bell, started a subsidiary company known as the Durango Trust to sell land and plan a Main Street, 2nd, and 3rd Avenue, and so on to organize the town, taking inspiration from how Palmer founded the city of Colorado Springs. Sales from the Durango Trust skyrocketed by the completion of the D&RG's Silverton Branch, and by 1885, Durango's business district had seven hotels and restaurants, eleven saloons, dance halls and stores, two bakeries and blacksmith shops, and a variety of other businesses, also boosting the town of Silverton's population to 2,000 at the time.

The D&RG(W) and the Rio Grande Southern Railroad were vital resources to many places, including Durango, before the major introduction of the automobile, helping transport goods such as produce and mineral traffic in and out of the Southwestern Colorado area, and along with other businesses such as the Durango Smelter, immensely supporting the town's economy. However, the Great Depression and aftermath of World War II hurt the area's railroad industry. The Rio Grande Southern lost its contract to transport mail in 1951, and soon thereafter suspended operations. The D&RGW also ended their San Juan Express passenger service from Durango to Alamosa. However, the natural scenery along their Silverton Branch had been recognized as a major tourist attraction. In turn, the D&RGW introduced the major tourism industry into the Durango area, transporting visitors up to Silverton and back and attracting Hollywood into La Plata County for a time. Once the D&RGW ended up losing its freight traffic in 1968, the tracks from Durango east to Chama, New Mexico, and south to Farmington, New Mexico, were removed, but the Silverton Branch remained in operation until 1981 when it was sold and became the Durango & Silverton Narrow Gauge Railroad.

There are significant archaeological sites surrounding the Durango area featured on the State and National historical registers, including:

- Mesa Verde National Park, a World Heritage site
- Chimney Rock National Monument, the most northeastern known outpost of the Ancestral Puebloans
- Durango Rock Shelters Archeology Site, a Basketmaker and Pueblo culture site
- Spring Creek Archeological District, a Basketmaker and Pueblo site
- Talus Village, a Basketmaker site

== Geography ==
At the 2020 United States census, the town had a total area of 10,946 acres (44.296 km^{2}), including 1,533 acres (6.203 km^{2}) of water.

=== Climate ===
According to the Köppen climate classification system, Durango has a mediterranean-influenced humid continental climate (Dsa / Dsb).

Climate data for Durango, Colorado, 1991–2020 normals, extremes 1991–2018
Month	Jan	Feb	Mar	Apr	May	Jun	Jul	Aug	Sep	Oct	Nov	Dec	Year
Record high °F (°C)	60 (16)	71 (22)	78 (26)	84 (29)	98 (37)	96 (36)	99 (37)	95 (35)	96 (36)	86 (30)	72 (22)	62 (17)	99 (37)
Mean daily maximum °F (°C)	39.2 (4.0)	45 (7)	54.1 (12.3)	62.8 (17.1)	71.3 (21.8)	81.3 (27.4)	85 (29)	82.3 (27.9)	75.7 (24.3)	64.3 (17.9)	50.1 (10.1)	39.9 (4.4)	62.6 (16.9)
Daily mean °F (°C)	26.1 (−3.3)	31.8 (−0.1)	39.6 (4.2)	46.4 (8.0)	54.3 (12.4)	63.5 (17.5)	68.9 (20.5)	66.9 (19.4)	60.1 (15.6)	48.6 (9.2)	36.4 (2.4)	26.7 (−2.9)	47.4 (8.6)
Mean daily minimum °F (°C)	13 (−11)	18.6 (−7.4)	25.1 (−3.8)	30 (−1)	37.2 (2.9)	45.6 (7.6)	52.9 (11.6)	51.5 (10.8)	44.5 (6.9)	32.9 (0.5)	22.7 (−5.2)	13.4 (−10.3)	32.3 (0.1)
Record low °F (°C)	−12 (−24)	−5 (−21)	0 (−18)	10 (−12)	21 (−6)	28 (−2)	35 (2)	40 (4)	26 (−3)	11 (−12)	−2 (−19)	−14 (−26)	−14 (−26)
Average precipitation inches (mm)	2.17 (55)	1.71 (43)	1.32 (34)	1.25 (32)	1.18 (30)	0.53 (13)	1.92 (49)	2.28 (58)	2.22 (56)	1.93 (49)	1.46 (37)	1.65 (42)	19.62 (498)
Average snowfall inches (cm)	19.4 (49)	15.4 (39)	5.3 (13)	3.8 (9.7)	0.2 (0.51)	0 (0)	0 (0)	0 (0)	0 (0)	1.1 (2.8)	5.5 (14)	13 (33)	63.7 (161.01)
Average extreme snow depth inches (cm)	10 (25)	9 (23)	6 (15)	1 (2.5)	0 (0)	0 (0)	0 (0)	0 (0)	0 (0)	0 (0)	2 (5.1)	5 (13)	10 (25)
Average precipitation days (≥ 0.01 in)	7.1	8	6.6	6.6	6.7	4.4	11.3	12.6	8.7	7.3	6.5	7.1	92.9
Average snowy days (≥ 0.1 in)	6.9	6.5	3.8	2.2	0.2	0	0	0	0	0.7	3.4	6	29.7
Source 1: NOAA
Source 2: XMACIS2

== Demographics ==
Historical population
Census	Pop.	Note	%±
1890	2,726		—
1900	3,317		21.7%
1910	4,686		41.3%
1920	4,116		−12.2%
1930	5,400		31.2%
1940	5,887		9.0%
1950	7,459		26.7%
1960	10,530		41.2%
1970	10,333		−1.9%
1980	11,649		12.7%
1990	12,430		6.7%
2000	13,922		12.0%
2010	16,887		21.3%
2020	19,071		12.9%
U.S. Decennial Census

=== 2020 census ===
As of the 2020 census, Durango had a population of 19,071. The median age was 35.4 years. 15.8% of residents were under the age of 18 and 15.1% of residents were 65 years of age or older. For every 100 females there were 103.9 males, and for every 100 females age 18 and over there were 102.0 males age 18 and over.

92.0% of residents lived in urban areas, while 8.0% lived in rural areas.

There were 8,158 households in Durango, of which 22.4% had children under the age of 18 living in them. Of all households, 34.4% were married-couple households, 25.8% were households with a male householder and no spouse or partner present, and 29.6% were households with a female householder and no spouse or partner present. About 35.0% of all households were made up of individuals and 12.1% had someone living alone who was 65 years of age or older.

There were 9,150 housing units, of which 10.8% were vacant. The homeowner vacancy rate was 2.4% and the rental vacancy rate was 7.9%.

Racial composition as of the 2020 census
Race	Number	Percentage
White	15,077	79.1%
Black or African American	109	0.6%
American Indian and Alaska Native	1,041	5.5%
Asian	220	1.2%
Native Hawaiian and Other Pacific Islander	9	0.0%
Some other race	985	5.2%
Two or more races	1,630	8.5%
Hispanic or Latino (of any race)	2,309	12.1%

=== 2000 census ===
As of the 2000 census, there were 13,922 people, 5,492 households, and 2,603 families residing in the city. The population density was 2,052.4 inhabitants per square mile (792.4/km^{2}). There were 5,819 housing units at an average density of 857.8 units per square mile (331.2 units/km^{2}). The racial makeup of the city was 86.8% White, 0.5% African American, 5.5% Native American, 0.7% Asian, 0.1% Pacific Islander, 4.1% from other races, and 2.2% from two or more races. Hispanic or Latino people of any race were 10.3% of the population.

There were 5,492 households, out of which 22.4% had children under the age of 18 living with them, 34.2% were married couples living together, 9.4% had a single female householder, and 52.6% were non-families. 31.8% of all households were made up of individuals, and 9% had someone living alone who was 65 years of age or older. The average household size was 2.23 and the average family size was 2.83.

In the city, 16.6% of residents were under the age of 18, 26.1% from 18 to 24, 27.2% from 25 to 44, 19.4% from 45 to 64, and 10.7% who were 65 years of age or older. The median age was 29 years. For every 100 females, there were 104.1 males. For every 100 females age 18 and over, there were 103.8 males.

The median income for a household in the city was $34,892, and the median income for a family was $50,814. Males had a median income of $31,812 versus $25,022 for females. The per capita income for the city was $19,352. 17.2% of the population and 7.3% of families were living below the poverty line. 11.2% of those younger than 18 and 8.9% of those 65 and older were living below the poverty line.

== Arts and culture ==
=== Main Avenue ===
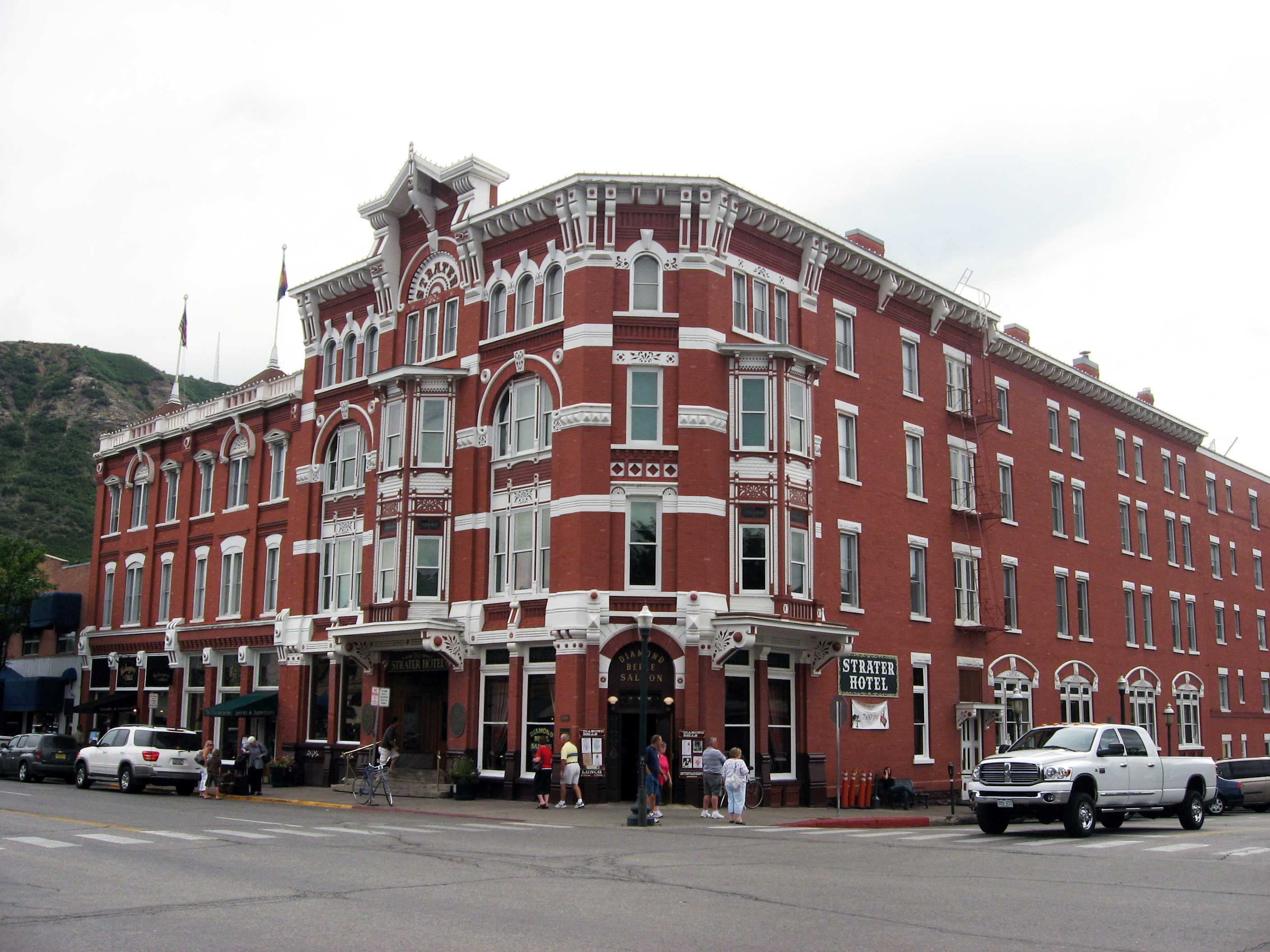
The Strater Hotel (2010)

Main Avenue is a Nationally Registered Historic District that cuts through downtown Durango and is home to galleries, boutiques, restaurants, bars, and other businesses. Two notable and historic hotels, the General Palmer and the Strater, lie at the south end of the avenue, near the Durango & Silverton Narrow Gauge Railroad depot. With its combination of historic architecture, entertainment, and shopping, Main Avenue has historically comprised the center of Durango and is a popular year-round tourist destination.

=== Durango & Silverton Narrow-Gauge Railroad ===
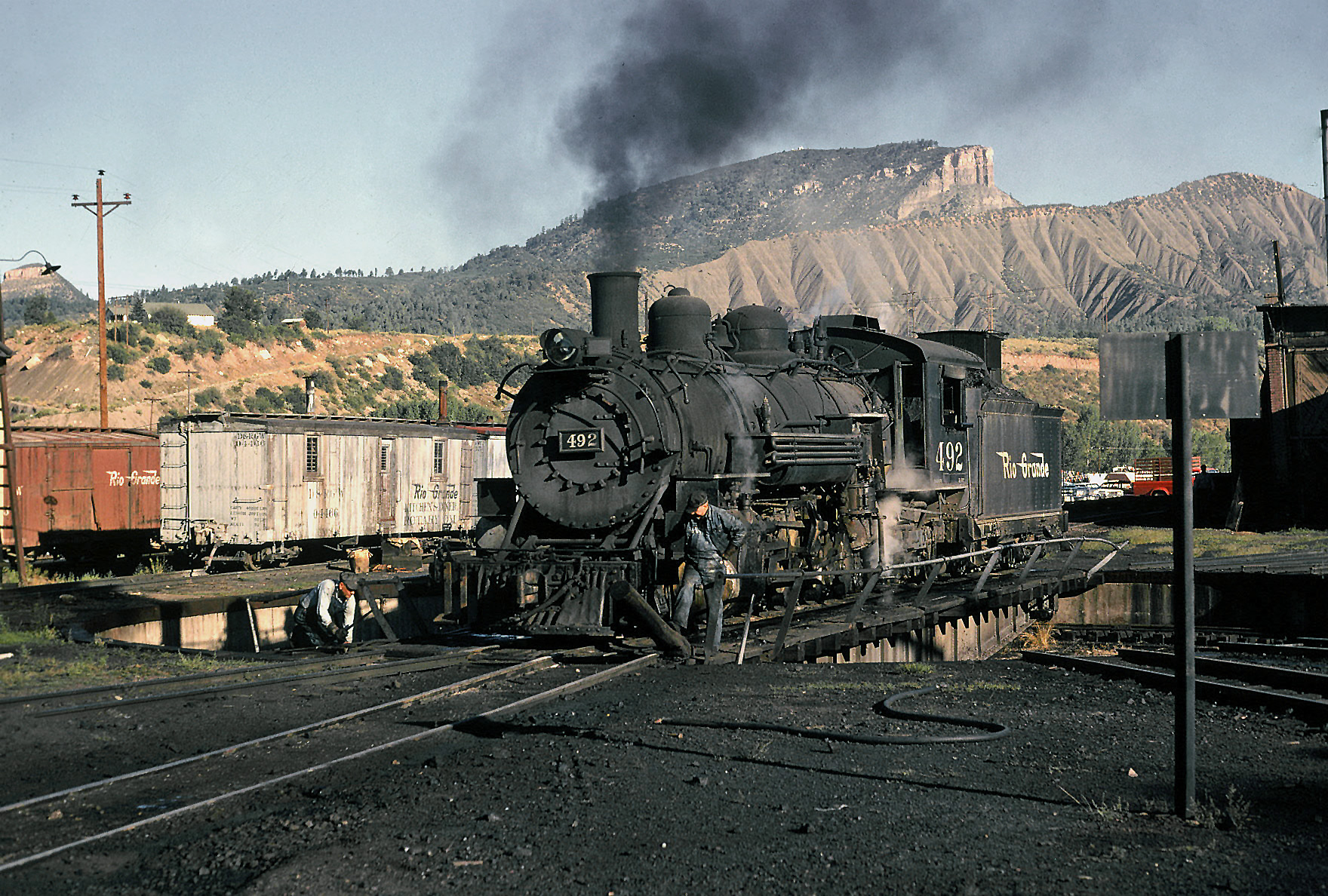
D&RGW steam locomotive on the Durango turntable (1965)

Durango is known worldwide for the Durango & Silverton Narrow-Gauge Railroad, a heritage railroad that operates what was the Denver & Rio Grande Western's Branchline to the historic mining town of Silverton, Colorado, also still notably using historic D&RGW Steam Locomotives and other historic rail equipment.

=== Snowdown Festival ===
Durango is home to Snowdown, an annual midwinter event popular for its Parade of Lights and other events. Since 1983, each year's festival has been given a unique theme. The event lasts 5 days, with competitions and costumes.

=== Durango Ragtime & Early Jazz Festival ===
The annual Durango Ragtime & Early Jazz Festival features noted musicians from around the country. It is held in the Strater Hotel, a historic Victorian hotel in Durango. It is hosted by popular Durango resident and ragtime pianist Adam Swanson.

=== Iron Horse Bicycle Classic ===
Founded in 1972, the Iron Horse is a 61-mile (98 km) bicycle road race held annually in Durango. Every year cyclists from around the world come together and race the Durango Narrow Gauge Train on its journey from Durango to Silverton.

== Economy ==
=== Top employers ===
With over 35,000 employees working in La Plata County, it is an economic hub in southwestern Colorado and the Four Corners region. According to Durango's 2024 Annual Comprehensive Financial Report, the county's top employers are:

Rank	Employer	Number of employees
1	Southern Ute Indian Reservation	1,600
2	City of Durango	1,047
3	Durango School District 9-R	998
4	Mercy Medical Center	901
5	Purgatory Resort	850
6	Fort Lewis College	683
7	La Plata County	445
8	Walmart	437
9	Bayfield School District 11-JT	216
10	Rocky Mountain Chocolate Factory	200

== Education ==
Durango is served by Durango School District 9-R. The district operates multiple schools in the city:

- Animas Valley Elementary School
- Florida Mesa Elementary School
- Fort Lewis Mesa Elementary School (located in Hesperus)
- Needham Elementary School
- Park Elementary School
- Riverview Elementary School
- Sunnyside Elementary School
- Escalante Middle School
- Miller Middle School
- Durango High School

Also located in Durango are the Juniper School and Animas High School (both public charter schools) and Big Picture High School, which offers alternative education.

=== Higher Education ===
- Fort Lewis College, a public four-year liberal arts college, sits on a 350-foot (110 m) mesa overlooking downtown Durango and is accredited by the Higher Learning Commission. As of 2024, 3,544 students were enrolled at FLC.
- Pueblo Community College Southwest, a branch of Pueblo Community College, is in the Durango High School building on North Main Avenue.

== Transportation ==
Durango is served by U.S. Highway 160 (the Old Spanish Trail), running east–west, and U.S. Highway 550, running north–south. Part of U.S. 550 offers high-speed access (primarily a 4-lane, divided highway) to Albuquerque, New Mexico. North of Durango, 550 is nicknamed the Million Dollar Highway, and is part of the scenic San Juan Skyway.

Durango is served by Durango–La Plata County Airport (IATA code: DRO), a major regional airport for southwestern Colorado, located near Ignacio, Colorado. The airport is serviced year-round by regional carriers Mesa Airlines (American Eagle), SkyWest Airlines (American Eagle and United Express), Republic Airways (United Express), and Envoy Air (American Eagle).

As of 2014, regional connecting hubs to DRO include Dallas/Fort Worth International Airport (DFW), Phoenix Sky Harbor International Airport (PHX), and Denver International Airport (DEN).

Durango Transit provides several loop bus routes in the community, including Fort Lewis College. Normal hours of operation are daily from 7:00 am to 8:30 pm. Ignacio Road Runner provides bus service to the nearby towns of Ignacio, Colorado, and Bayfield, Colorado, with four trips daily on weekdays and one on Saturdays. Both services share the Durango Transit Center as a hub.

Greyhound Lines formerly served Durango, but after budget cuts, the service was discontinued. Since 2014, Road Runner Transit (a service of Southern Ute Community Action Programs) has restored daily bus service between Grand Junction and Durango. Since 2018, Road Runner's service has been incorporated into the larger mantle of the state-run program Bustang.

== Media ==
Durango has a number of media outlets, such as the newspaper The Durango Herald. Some radio stations in Durango are 99x Durango, The Point, KDGO, XRock 105.3, KDUR 91.9/93.9, and Four Corners Broadcasting (KIQX 101.3, KRSJ 100.5, KKDC 93.3, and KKDC AM 930).

== Notable people ==
- Paco Ahlgren, writer
- Riley Amos, cyclist
- Ross Anderson, professional speed skier
- Christopher Blevins, cyclist
- Steve Carlton, Baseball Hall of Fame pitcher
- Ann Cummins, novelist and short story writer
- Robert E. DeNier (1921–2010), member of the Colorado House of Representatives and the Colorado Senate
- Noah Dillon, photographer and musician
- James Garesche Ord, United States Army Major General
- Missy Giove, cyclist
- Howard Grotts, cyclist
- Greg Herbold, cyclist
- Sarah Hirshland (born 1975), chief executive officer of the United States Olympic Committee
- Sepp Kuss, cyclist
- Ned Overend, cyclist
- Bob Roll, retired pro cyclist
- Stuart Roosa, NASA astronaut
- Johnnie Seale, MLB pitcher for the Detroit Tigers
- Quinn Simmons, cyclist
- John Henry Slattery, Colorado politician
- Ed Stasium, record producer
- Tom Tully, Oscar-nominated actor
- Shan Wells, sculptor and illustrator
- Todd Wells, cyclist

== Sister cities ==
Durango has two sister cities, as designated by Sister Cities International:

- Durango, Mexico
- Durango, Spain

== References in television and film ==
The Denver & Rio Grande Western Railroad began to advertise the La Plata County Area to Hollywood beginning in the mid-1930s, kick-starting Durango's future in film appearances.

- Parts of the 1948 film Colorado Territory were filmed in the Durango area including the Railroad Depot and the D&RGW's railroad line south to Farmington, New Mexico.
- The 1950 film A Ticket to Tomahawk was shot primarily in the La Plata County area involving the D&RGW's Silverton Branch (later to become the Durango & Silverton Narrow Gauge Railroad), filmed north of Durango, Silverton, Colorado, on the current site of Fort Lewis College, as well as a shot of a Rio Grande Southern Railroad Trestle located west of Durango near Wild Cat Canyon. This was one of Marilyn Monroe's first onscreen appearances as well.
- Much of the 1952 film Denver and Rio Grande was shot on whats now the D&RGW's Silverton Branch, retelling the story of the D&RG's battle for rights into the Royal Gorge, against the Atchison, Topeka and Santa Fe Railroad.
- Much of the 1953 western movie The Naked Spur starring James Stewart was shot in Durango.
- Several parts of the 1955 western film Run for Cover starring James Cagney, were filmed just north of Durango in and around the upper Hermosa Valley area. Includes shots of the D&RGW Silverton Branch as well.
- Portions of the 1957 western Night Passage starring a returning James Stewart, as well as Audie Murphy and Brandon deWilde were filmed near Durango and on the D&RGW's Silverton Branch.
- Parts of the 1969 film Butch Cassidy and the Sundance Kid were filmed north of town along the Animas River, as well as scenes of the D&RGW Railroad on the Silverton branch, and southeast of Durango near Florida, as well as other locations on the D&RGW narrow gauge system.
- The 1978 Roger Corman film Avalanche, starring Rock Hudson and Mia Farrow, was filmed mainly at Durango Mountain Resort and at the Lodge at Tamarron in north Durango.
- The television series Cannon, episode "Sky Above, Death Below" was filmed in and around Durango, Purgatory Resort, and Chimney Rock.
- Part of the 1991 film City Slickers was shot in Durango.
- The 1999 movie Durango Kids describes a time tunnel in the old mines outside of Durango.
- Parts of the 1993 film Cliffhanger were shot in Durango.
- The 2024 documentary Hacking at Leaves features the local maker space called "Maker Lab".

== See also ==
- Durango, CO Micropolitan Statistical Area
- Durango & Silverton Narrow-Gauge Railroad
- Old Spanish National Historic Trail
