= Mike Brunson =

American football player (1947–2002)

- Brunson in 1972

No. 19
- Positions: Halfback, wingback, wide receiver, return specialist

Personal information
- Born: July 30, 1947; Little Rock, Arkansas, U.S.
- Died: September 18, 2002 (aged 55)
- Listed height: 6 ft 1 in (1.85 m)
- Listed weight: 190 lb (86 kg)

Career information
- High school: Cortez (Cortez, Colorado)
- College: Mesa (CO), Arizona State
- NFL draft: 1970: 11th round, 272nd overall pick

Career history
- Atlanta Falcons (1970); Atlanta Falcons (1971–1972)*; Houston Oilers (1973)*; St. Louis Cardinals (1974)*
- * Offseason or practice squad member only

Awards and highlights
- All-Intermountain Collegiate Athletic Conference (1967); Colorado Mesa University Athletics Hall of Honor (2013)

Career NFL statistics
- Games played: 8
- Kickoff return yards: 54
- Rushing yards: 9
- Stats at Pro Football Reference

Michael Sanders Brunson (July 30, 1947 – September 18, 2002) was an American football player. He played college football as a halfback at Mesa College (now known as Colorado Mesa University) in 1967 and as a wingback at Arizona State University in 1968 and 1969. He also played in the National Football League as a return specialist and running back for the Atlanta Falcons in 1970. He was on the Falcons' taxi squad as a wide receiver in 1971 and 1972 and also played in the pre-season for the Houston Oilers in 1973 and the St. Louis Cardinals in 1974.

After his playing career ended, he was an elementary school teacher and coach in Phoenix, Arizona, for many years. The Brunson-Lee Elementary school in Phoenix was named in his honor, and he was posthumously inducted into the Colorado Mesa University Athletics Hall of Honor in 2013.

== Early life ==
Brunson was born in Little Rock, Arkansas, but moved with his family to Colorado. He attended Cortez High School (now Montezuma-Cortez High School) in Cortez, Colorado. At Cortez, he was a star athlete in football, basketball, and track. As a senior, he led the Southwestern League in football scoring with 54 points, tallying nine touchdowns in four games. He also averaged 18.4 points a game for the basketball team and was a first-team selection on the All-Southwestern League team. On the track team, he competed in the 100-yard dash and broad jump and set records in the quarter mile and the triple jump.

== College career ==
=== Mesa ===
After high school, Brunson enrolled at Mesa College in Grand Junction, Colorado. He competed in track and football at Mesa. At a track meet in April 1967, he set a meet record with a time of 49.45 in the 440-yard dash. In the fall of 1967, Brunston played at the halfback position and led Mesa's football team to its best record (8–1–1) since 1956. Brunson tallied 714 rushing yards and 265 receiving yards, winning first-team honors on the Intermountain Collegiate Athletic Conference all-star football team. He was also selected by his teammates as the team's most outstanding back.

=== Arizona State ===
After the 1967 football season, Brunson received scholarship offers from multiple universities, including Colorado State and Arizona State. He chose Arizona State and was the Sun Devils' starting wingback in 1968 and 1969, tallying 22 receptions for 414 yards while also rushing for 124 yards. Despite a shoulder injury that shortened his senior season in 1969, he averaged 19.9 yards per reception and 8.4 yards per rushing carry.

== Professional football ==
Brunson was selected 272nd overall by the Atlanta Falcons in the 11th round of the 1970 NFL draft. He began the 1970 season on Atlanta's taxi squad, but was activated in mid-October, appearing in eight games, principally as a return specialist. He returned four kickoffs for a total of 54 yards. He also had one rushing carry for nine yards against the Chicago Bears.

Brunson returned to the Falcons in 1971, but he was waived in the week before the season opener. He was retained as a taxi squad wide receiver in 1971. He returned to the Falcons' camp for a third season in 1972, showing promise as a "deep threat" wide receiver. However, he was cut at the end of August 1972. Al Thomy of The Atlantta Constitution called Brunson's release a "mild surprise", as he "had appeared improved on his catching."

In June 1973, Brunson signed with the Houston Oilers, but he was released in late August.

Brunson's final stint in the NFL came in 1974 with the St. Louis Cardinals. However, he was placed on injured reserve in early September.

== Family and later years ==
Brunson's younger brother Larry Brunson also played in the NFL, as a wide receiver from 1974 to 1980.

Brunson and his wife, Essie, had two sons, Michael and Marcus. Marcus won All-American honors in track at Arizona State.

Brunson worked for 23 years as a physical education teacher and coach at Crockett Elementary School in Phoenix, Arizona. He retired in May 2002, as he was suffering from colon cancer. At his retirement party, teachers, administrators, former Arizona State teammates, and his former head football coach Frank Kush joined in the celebration. He died four months later at age 55.

== Legacy ==
Brunson was remembered for his sense of humor, his "huge grin", as a "gadget guy", and as a maker of banana ice cream. His school principal recalled: "Coach was the kind of man who never let an opportunity go by to say something nice. The miracle of his life was that he made each of us feel valued and supportive."

In December 2002, the Balsz Elementary School District's governing board chose to name its new school the Brunson-Lee Elementary School in honor of Brunson and another teacher, Ginger Lee. One board member explained: "The guy, he was sunshine. The guy smiled all the time. I think he'll smile on this school."

Brunson was posthumously inducted into the Colorado Mesa University Athletics Hall of Honor in 2013.
