= Colorado State Highway 184 =

Highway in Colorado

State Highway 184
- Map of Montezuma County in southwestern Colorado with SH 184 highlighted in red

Route information
- Maintained by CDOT
- Length: 26.599 mi (42.807 km)

Major junctions
- West end: US 491 near Lewis
- SH 145 near Dolores; US 160 in Mancos
- East end: US 160 Bus. in Mancos

Location
- Country: United States
- State: Colorado
- Counties: Montezuma

Highway system
- Colorado State Highway System; Interstate; US; State; Scenic
← SH 183	→ SH 187

State Highway 184 (SH 184) is a 26.599 mi (42.807 km) long state highway in the southwestern corner of Colorado. SH 184's western terminus is at U.S. Route 491 (US 491) near Lewis, and the eastern terminus is at U.S. Route 160 Business (US 160 Bus.) in Mancos.

== Route description ==
SH 184 begins in the west at its junction with US 491 near Lewis and travels ESE to Mancos. The highway has a one mile (1.6 km) overlap with SH 145 just south of Dolores which is not technically part of SH 184 making the actual driving distance from Lewis to Mancos just over 26.5 miles (42.6 km). It also intersects US 160 near Mancos, near its eastern terminus at US 160 Bus.

== History ==
The route was established in 1939, when it connected US 160 at Arriola to Mancos. Most of the route was deleted by 1954, leaving approximately nine miles near Mancos. The route was extended to Dolores by 1978, when it was entirely paved.

== Major intersections ==
The entire route is in Montezuma County.

Location	mi	km	Destinations	Notes
	0.000	0.000	US 491 – Dove Creek, Cortez	Western terminus
	8.159	13.131	SH 145 south – Cortez	Western terminus of SH 145 concurrency
	8.900	14.323	SH 145 north – Dolores	Eastern terminus of SH 145 concurrency
Mancos	26.444	42.557	US 160 – Durango, Cortez	
Mancos	26.599	42.807	US 160 Bus.	Eastern terminus
1.000 mi = 1.609 km; 1.000 km = 0.621 mi: Concurrency terminus
