= Cowboy Wash =

American archaeological sites

- Location within the United States
- Location: Montezuma County, Colorado, USA
- Coordinates: 37°10′47″N 108°50′43″W

Cowboy Wash is a group of nine archaeological sites used by Ancestral Puebloans (previously known as Anasazi) in Montezuma County, southwestern Colorado, United States. Each site includes one to three pit houses, and was discovered in 1993 during an archaeological dig. The remains of twelve humans were found at one of the pit house sites, dating to the 12th century.

== Initial dig ==
The site, designated 5MT10010, dates to between approximately 1150 and 1175 A.D. It is located on the south slopes of Ute Mountain near Towaoc, approximately 15 miles west of Mesa Verde, the famous Ancestral Pueblo cliff dwellings. Some archeologists believe that the site was settled by immigrants from Chaco Canyon, or the Chuska Mountains.

Five of the human skeletons at the site were from burials. The remaining seven exhibited many signs of cannibalism including defleshing, fragmentation of long bones to extract marrow, chopped, cut, and blackened bones. A stone tool kit appropriate for butchering a mid-sized mammal was found. The initial excavation was supervised by University of North Carolina archaeologist Brian Billman, employed by a private firm contracted by the Ute Mountain Ute Tribe. The land on which the site was located is within the Ute Mountain Indian Reservation and was owned by a local Ute religious leader, who supervised the dig and reburied the bones once the examination was complete.

What is particularly interesting about the Cowboy Wash site is that it appears to have been abandoned very quickly. Generally, the ancient peoples would have taken all salvageable materials with them, yet the excavators found everything had been left behind.

== Analysis of coprolite ==
The initial reports speculating that the seven humans had been cannibalized was met with skepticism from some scientists and criticism by Native American groups including the Ute tribe. (The Ute are a separate people from either the alleged victims or the alleged perpetrators.) The Ute have a strong oral tradition of peace between their ancestors and neighboring groups, which is not necessarily in agreement with the traditions of other groups or historical information.

To investigate the theory that cannibalism had been practiced at the Cowboy Wash site, Richard Marlar, a University of Colorado molecular biologist examined the coprolite (fossilized human feces) found on site and discovered it tested positive for human myoglobin, which is found in human muscle tissue. This type of myoglobin was not found in 20 'control' coprolites in comparable sites. This indicated the feces contained the remains of digested human flesh. Marlar also found the myoglobin protein during a chemical analysis of a cooking pot at the ancient Ancestral Pueblo site.

== Explanation ==
There are conflicting theories about whether or not cannibalism occurred at Cowboy Wash. According to Billman, the current explanation for the apparent cannibalism was that drought struck the region, prompting groups to move and seek food. This led to territorial conflicts between groups and a decline in social order. The remains were dated to be around the time consistent with the demise of the Chaco system. Some researchers have found reference to warfare-related cannibalism within Puebloan culture, for example, that among the Hopi, "chewing on shreds of enemy scalps was thought to make children brave hearted". However, others speculate that the coprolite found at Cowboy Wash contains remains of Ancient Pueblo people who were killed and consumed by a cultural outsider.

Other theories include the bones reflect evidence of reburial rituals or perhaps ritual killing of those suspected of witchcraft. It has even been suggested that Billman's team mistook a coyote coprolite for human.

== Fictional References ==
Cowboy Wash is one of the key locations in the historical novel People of the Moon, By W. Michael Gear, Kathleen O'Neal Gear, published in 2005. A foreword identifies the fictional Saltbush Farmstead with the Cowboy Wash site.

== See also ==
- List of prehistoric sites in Colorado
