= Old Cortez High School =

- Cortez High School
- U.S. National Register of Historic Places
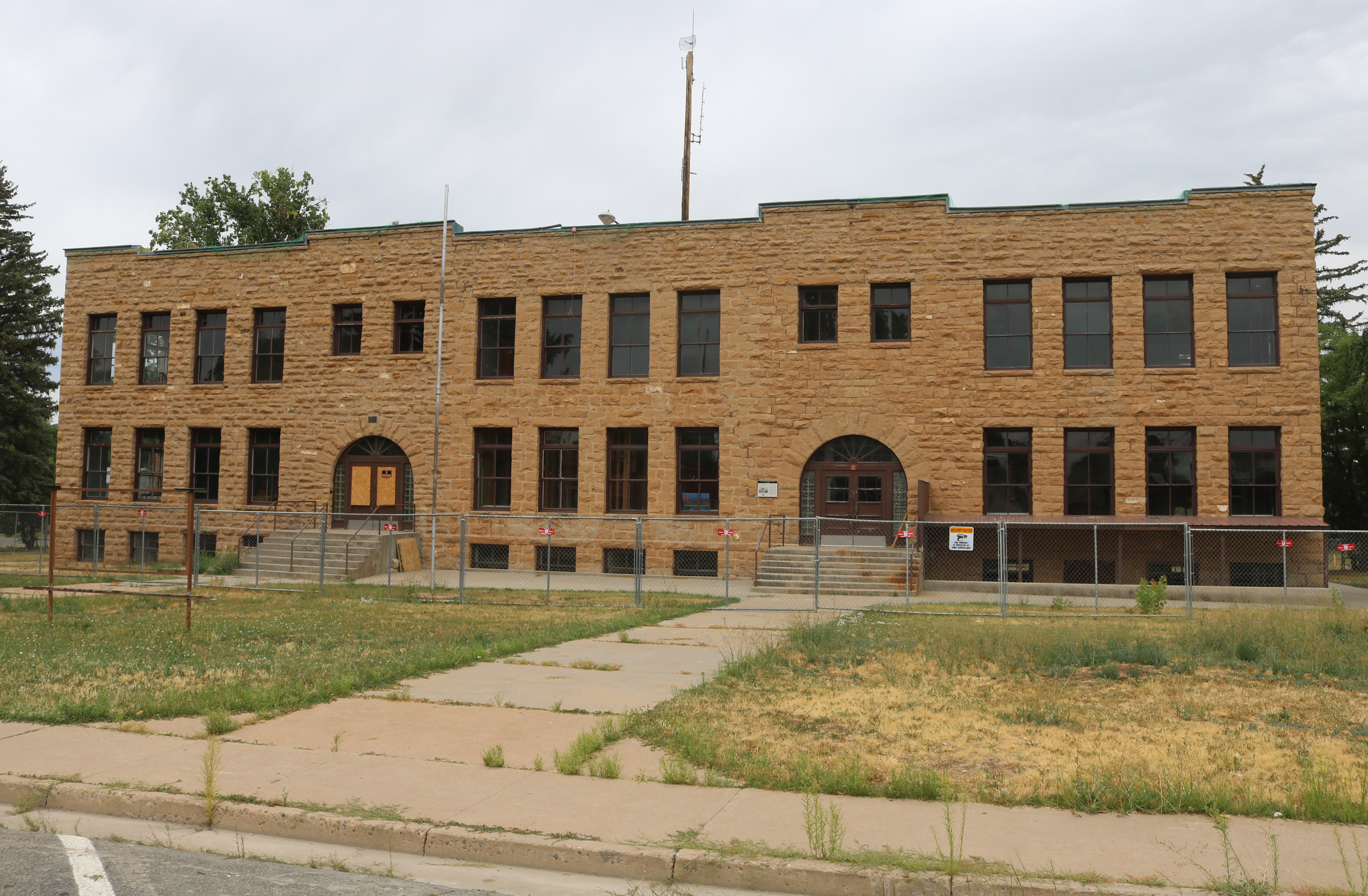
- The school in 2019

- Location within Colorado
- Location: 121 E. First St., Cortez, Colorado
- Coordinates: 37°20′50″N 108°34′59″W
- NRHP reference No.: 16000098
- Added to NRHP: March 22, 2016

Cortez High School, at 121 E. First St. in Cortez, Colorado, was built in 1909 and operated as a school until 1968.

It was listed on the National Register of Historic Places in 2016.

It was Cortez' old high school, most recently Calkins Jr. High School. It became a junior high school in 1946 when Montezuma-Cortez High School opened.

Its National Register nomination document was not available during government shutdown in January 2019.
