= Lewis, Colorado =

Census-designated place in Montezuma County, CO, USA

- Census-designated place
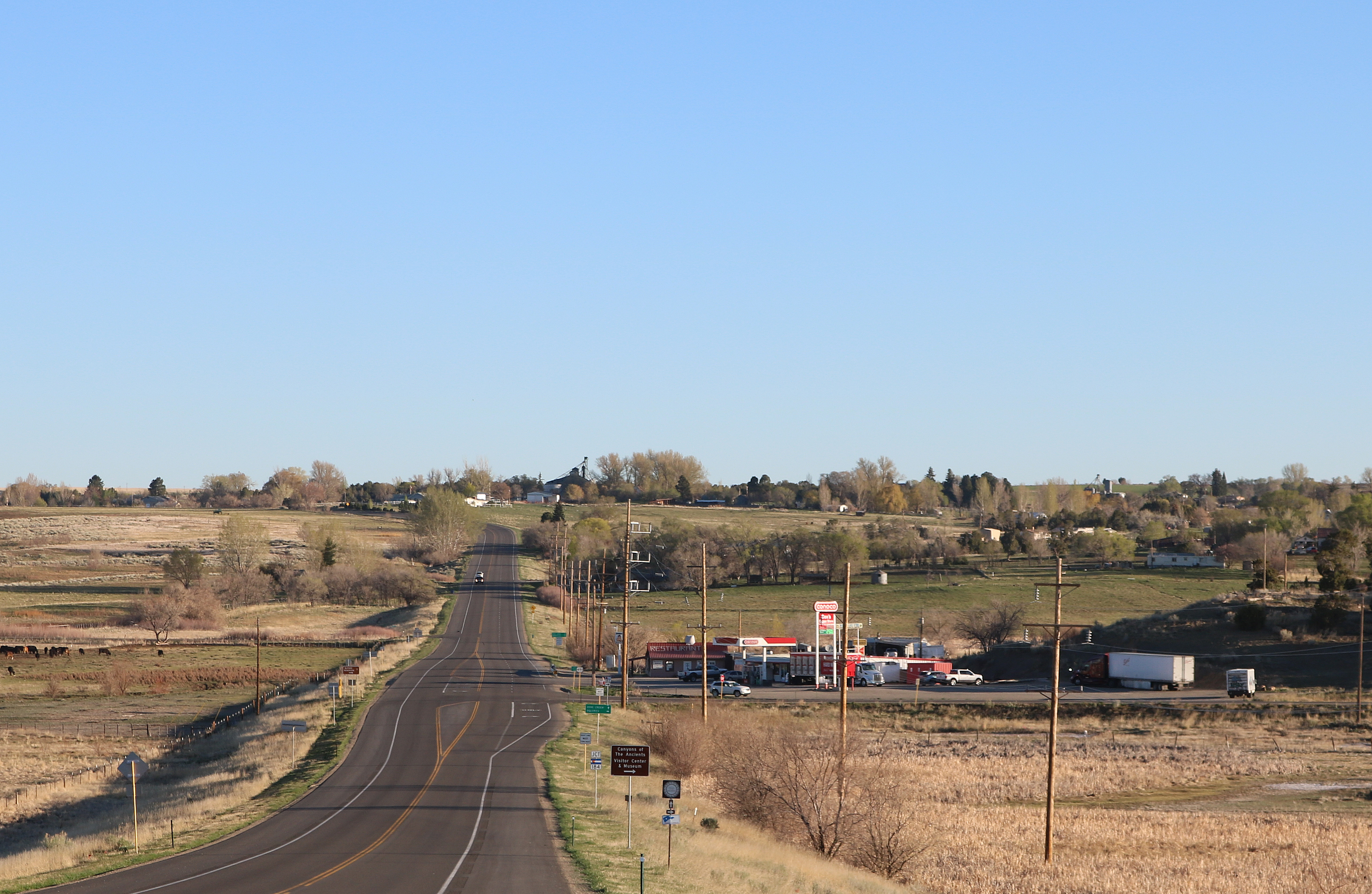
- Looking north along U.S. Route 491 in Lewis

- Location in Montezuma County, Colorado
- Coordinates: 37°29′50″N 108°39′33″W
- Country: United States
- State: Colorado
- County: Montezuma County

Government
  - Type: Unincorporated area

Area
  - Total: 3.110 sq mi (8.056 km^{2})
  - Land: 3.110 sq mi (8.056 km^{2})
  - Water: 0 sq mi (0.000 km^{2})
- Elevation: 6,726 ft (2,050 m)

Population (2020)
  - Total: 257
  - Density: 83/sq mi (31.9/km^{2})
- Time zone: UTC-7 (MST)
  - Summer (DST): UTC-6 (MDT)
- ZIP Code: 81327
- Area code: 970
- GNIS feature: 2583259

Lewis is an unincorporated town, a post office, and a census-designated place (CDP) located in and governed by Montezuma County, Colorado, United States. The Lewis post office has the ZIP Code 81327. At the 2020 census, the population of the Lewis CDP was 257, down from 302 in 2010.

== Geography ==
Lewis is in northern Montezuma County, on the northeast side of U.S. Route 491, which leads south 11 miles (18 km) to Cortez, the county seat, and northwest 48 miles (77 km) to Monticello, Utah. Colorado State Highway 184 leaves US 491 at the southern edge of the community and leads east 10 miles (16 km) to Dolores.

The Lewis CDP has an area of 1,990.7 acres (8.056 km^{2}), all land.

== Demographics ==
The United States Census Bureau initially defined the Lewis CDP for the United States Census 2010.

Lewis CDP, Colorado
Year	Pop.	±%
2010	302	—
2020	257	−14.9%
Source: United States Census Bureau

== Education ==
It is in the Montezuma-Cortez School District RE-1. The district's comprehensive high school is Montezuma-Cortez High School.

== See also ==
- Old Spanish National Historic Trail
