= Mancos, Colorado =

Town in Colorado, United States

- Statutory Town
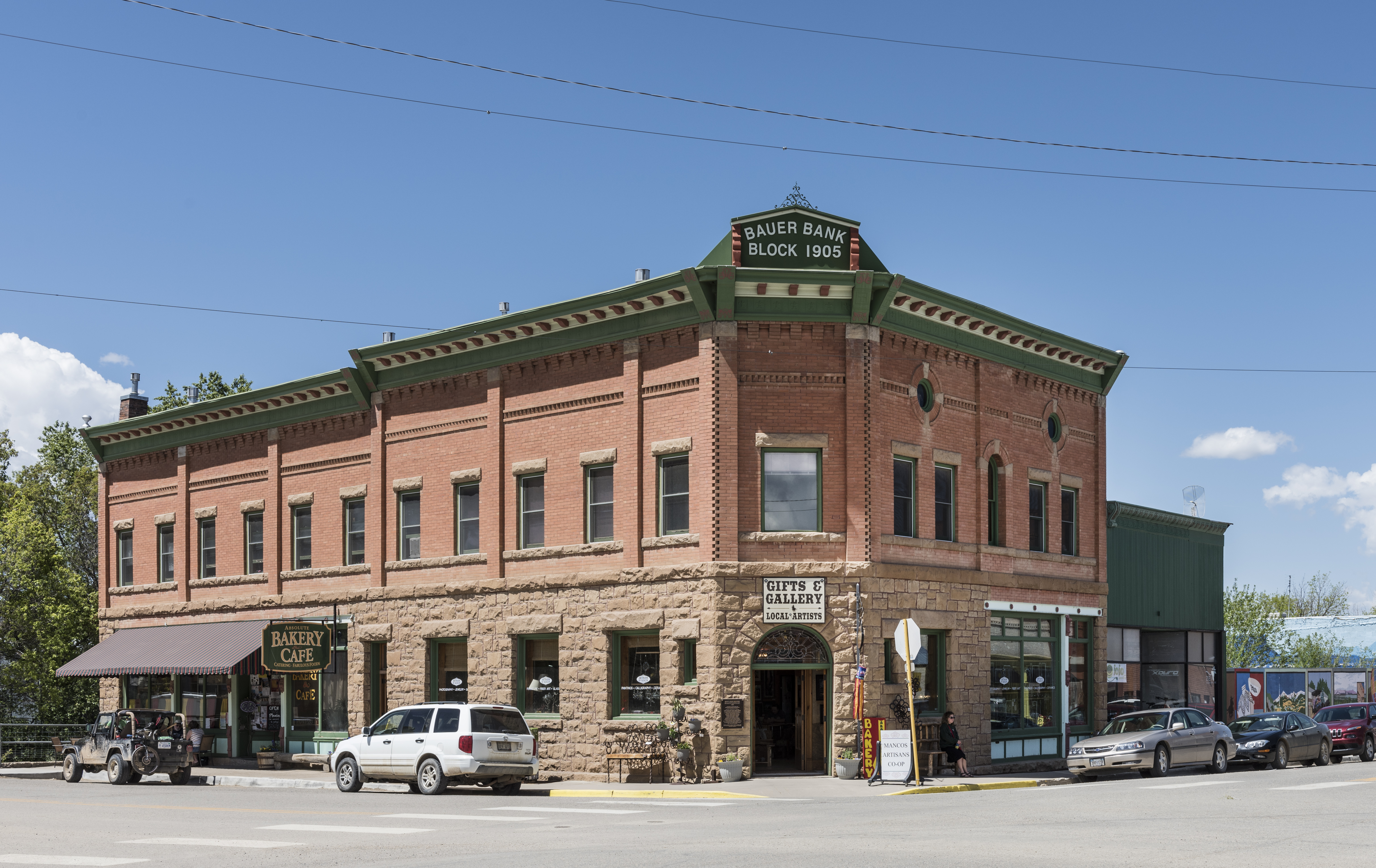
- The 1905 Bauer Bank Block building in Mancos
- Nickname: Gateway to Mesa Verde
- Location in Montezuma County, Colorado
- Coordinates: 37°20′48″N 108°17′38″W
- Country: United States
- State: Colorado
- County: Montezuma
- Founded: 1894
- Incorporated (town): November 30, 1894

Government
  - Type: Statutory Town

Area
  - Total: 0.638 sq mi (1.65 km^{2})
  - Land: 0.638 sq mi (1.65 km^{2})
  - Water: 0.00 sq mi (0 km^{2})
- Elevation: 7,011 ft (2,137 m)

Population (2020)
  - Total: 1,196
  - Density: 1,874.6/sq mi (723.8/km^{2})
- Time zone: UTC-7 (Mountain (MST))
  - Summer (DST): UTC-6 (MDT)
- ZIP code: 81328
- Area code: 970
- FIPS code: 08-48115
- GNIS feature ID: 2412939
- Website: www.mancoscolorado.com

Mancos is a statutory town in Montezuma County, Colorado, United States. The population was 1,196 at the 2020 census, down from 1,336 in 2010.

The town is in southwestern Colorado, at the base of Mesa Verde National Park, and holds the trademark for "Gateway to Mesa Verde". Surrounded by rangeland and mountains, Mancos offers a variety of outdoor recreational activities. The town was founded in 1894, near the site where early Spanish explorers first crossed the Mancos River. It is the commercial center for east Montezuma County, and was considered at one time as a county seat. It is served by U.S. Highway 160 and State Highway 184.

== History ==
=== Ancient Pueblo people ===
The Mancos Valley has been settled since at least the 10th century AD, although various severe conditions in the mid to late 13th century saw the area and its multitude of small villages abandoned by the ancient Pueblo people (Anasazi). The Mancos area is dotted with inventoried and uninventoried archeological sites, including both isolated houses and shelters and small village complexes. Mancos Valley residents were probably among those who withdrew to the cliff dwellings on Mesa Verde, perhaps for defensive purposes, due to climate change, or as part of concentration policy of possible invaders and occupiers of the region.

Archaeological sites of the ancient Pueblo period include:

- Bement site, a Colorado State Register of Historic Properties site, representing the first and second Pueblo periods. Between AD 750-850 there was one shelter on the site. About 150 years later, a group of six structures were inhabited from 1000 to 1150.
- Lost Canyon Archeological District, on the National Register of Historic Places, which may have been the northernmost boundary of the Mesa Verde ancient Pueblo people from about AD 1000–1300.

=== Native American tribes ===
Control of the area was contested by nomadic Navajo and Ute people for centuries. Spanish friars and military passed through the area as part of the Old Spanish Trail connecting New Mexico and California in the 18th century. The name "Mancos" comes from the Domínguez–Escalante expedition of 1776, though the reason for the name remains unclear (see below). By some unverified accounts, the name Mancos refers to the crippled nature of the Spanish explorers' horses after they crossed the San Juan Mountains. According to unverified lore, the horses were rejuvenated by the lush green grass in the Mancos Valley. Somewhere in the town is the point at which the expedition crossed the Rio Mancos on its way to California from Old Mexico.

=== 19th and 20th century ===
The Old Spanish Trail trade route passed through the area of Mancos from 1829 into the 1850s.

Part of the original Ute Reservation in 1868, Mancos was part of the San Juan Cession of 1873, and cattle ranchers began settling the Mancos Valley in the 1870s, providing cattle to the mining camps of the San Juan and La Plata ranges. Today, the boundary of the Ute Mountain Indian Reservation is located some 6 miles (10 km) south of the town, which the Ute call Maaküs. At the time it was founded, Mancos served as the primary commercial trading center for eastern Montezuma County, rivaling the town of Dolores to the northwest. At that time, Cortez, now the county seat, was barely a bend in the wagon trail. In the 1890s, Mancos was platted and built as a stop along the Rio Grande Southern Railroad built by Otto Mears - Colorado's southwestern railroad pathfinder, connecting Durango to the east and the Telluride mining districts to the north, via Dolores. Ranchers in the Mancos Valley continued to provide beef, timber, and other agricultural products to the mining camps. Following this, Latter-day Saints colonists moved into the area and established farms and small communities such as Weber and Cherry Creek.

Local farmers and ranchers began constructing irrigation canals to bring water from the Mancos River to cropland and pasture in various parts of the Mancos Valley in the late 1870s and 1880s, and by the beginning of the 20th century a large network of irrigation ditches and laterals was operating and continues to operate (with improvements) today. In the mid-2000s, a large project, the Mancos Valley Salinity Control Project, was funded by various sources, including the US Bureau of Reclamation, the Natural Resources Conservation Service, and local irrigation and water companies and districts. The project, nearly complete in 2010, includes replacing many open irrigation ditches with piping to conserve water and prevent salt contamination from infiltration and evaporation of irrigation water. Many of the original irrigation ditches have been determined to be eligible for the National Register of Historic Places, together with various archeological sites.

Incorporated in 1894, Mancos town government quickly asserted itself, banning fast riding and driving (of wagons) in town the next year, as well as building boardwalks. A water system and electrical system were constructed in 1904, followed by a new bridge across the river in 1905 and concrete sidewalks in 1909. However, most side streets of the town remain unpaved. The abandonment of the railroad in the 1950s allowed US 160 to be rerouted to follow the present Railroad Avenue, leaving Grand Avenue, the town's main street, as a business route; an earlier route of US 160 is now County Road J, south of the river and most of the town. The establishment of Mesa Verde National Park also encouraged early growth of Mancos.

Attempts to create a separate Mancos County from the eastern portion of Montezuma County in the mid-20th century failed. Agricultural development, and to a certain extent, tourism, benefited from the Mancos Project of the US Bureau of Reclamation in the 1950s, which created Jackson Reservoir north of the town, today the site of Mancos State Park. This project also supplies water for the town, a rural water district, and Mesa Verde National Park.

Several Mancos sites from about the turn of the 20th century are listed on the state or national register of historic places. The first two are on the Colorado State Register of Historic Properties, the remaining are on the National Register of Historic Places:

=== Bauer Bank Block ===
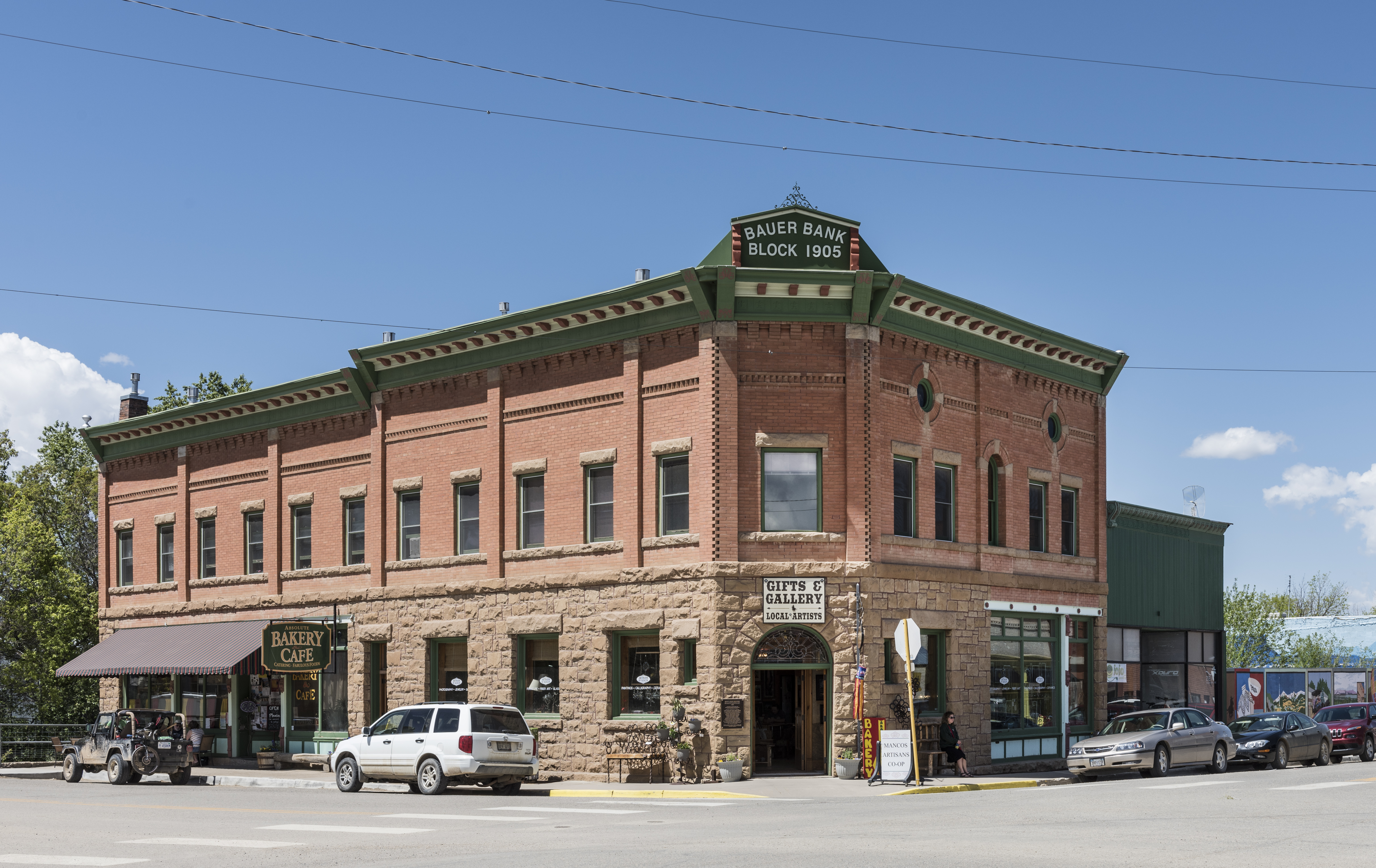
Bauer Bank Block in 2015

The Bauer Bank Block, also known as the Bauer Bank Building, is an early commercial style structure built in 1905 and is the oldest surviving masonry building in the Mancos Valley. From 1907 to 1911 the second floor housed the first administrative headquarters for Mesa Verde National Park, and from 1927 to 1965 a portion of the building served as a U.S. post office. It was listed on the National Register of Historic Places in 2003.

=== Bauer House ===
The Bauer House was built in 1889 for George Bauer, a Mancos pioneer merchant who also built the town's first store in 1881.

=== Mancos High School ===
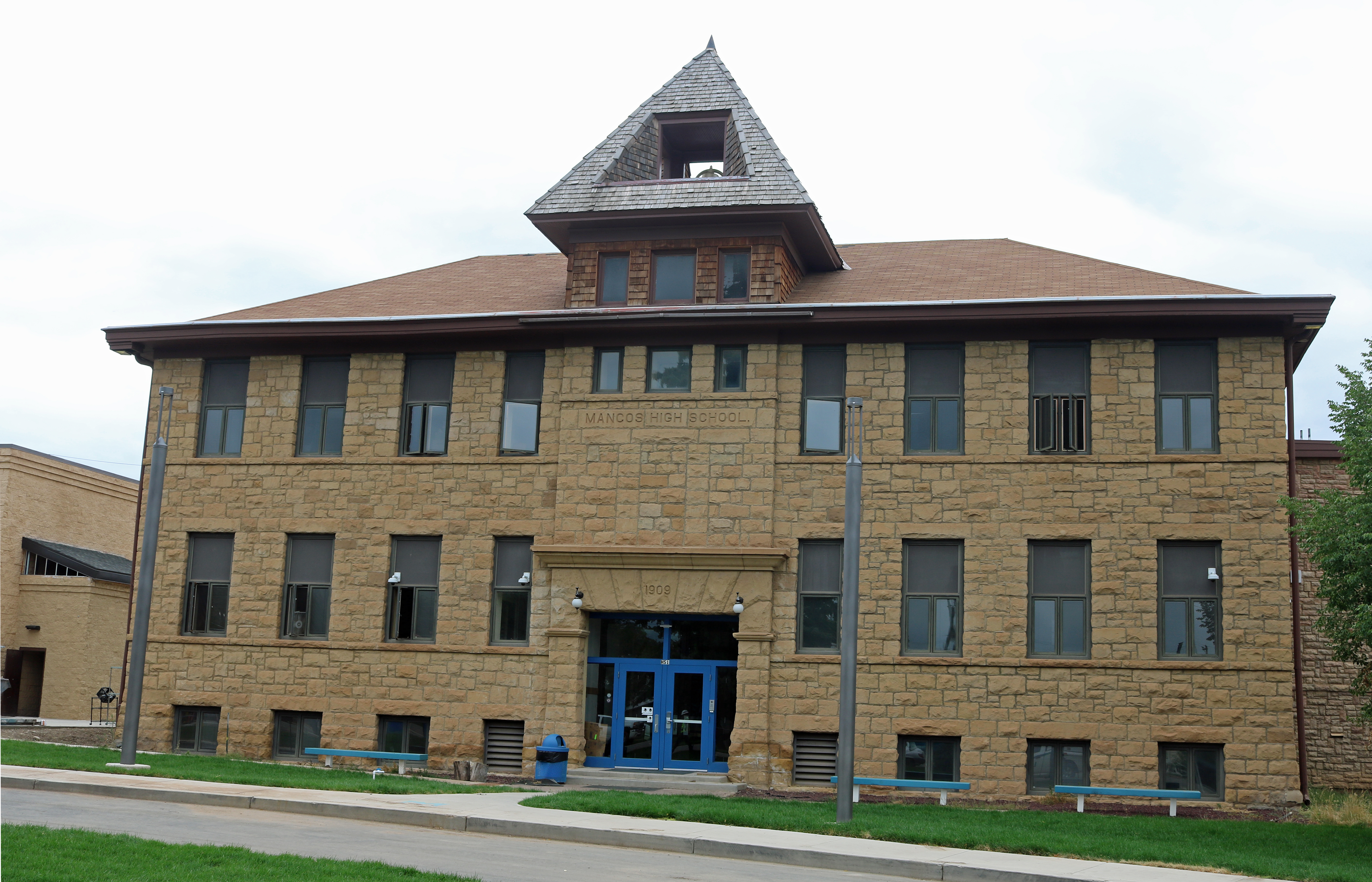
Mancos High School in 2019

Mancos High School is a 2-story sandstone structure built in 1909 and listed on the National Register of Historic Places in 1991. It was renovated in 1954, and again in 2020, and is considered historically notable for the unique design and its function as a community meeting hall when it was first constructed. Though it was Montezuma County's first high school, the actual school has since been moved to another building.

=== Mancos Opera House ===
The Mancos Opera House is a three-story brick structure built in 1910 out of locally produced bricks.

=== Wrightsman House ===
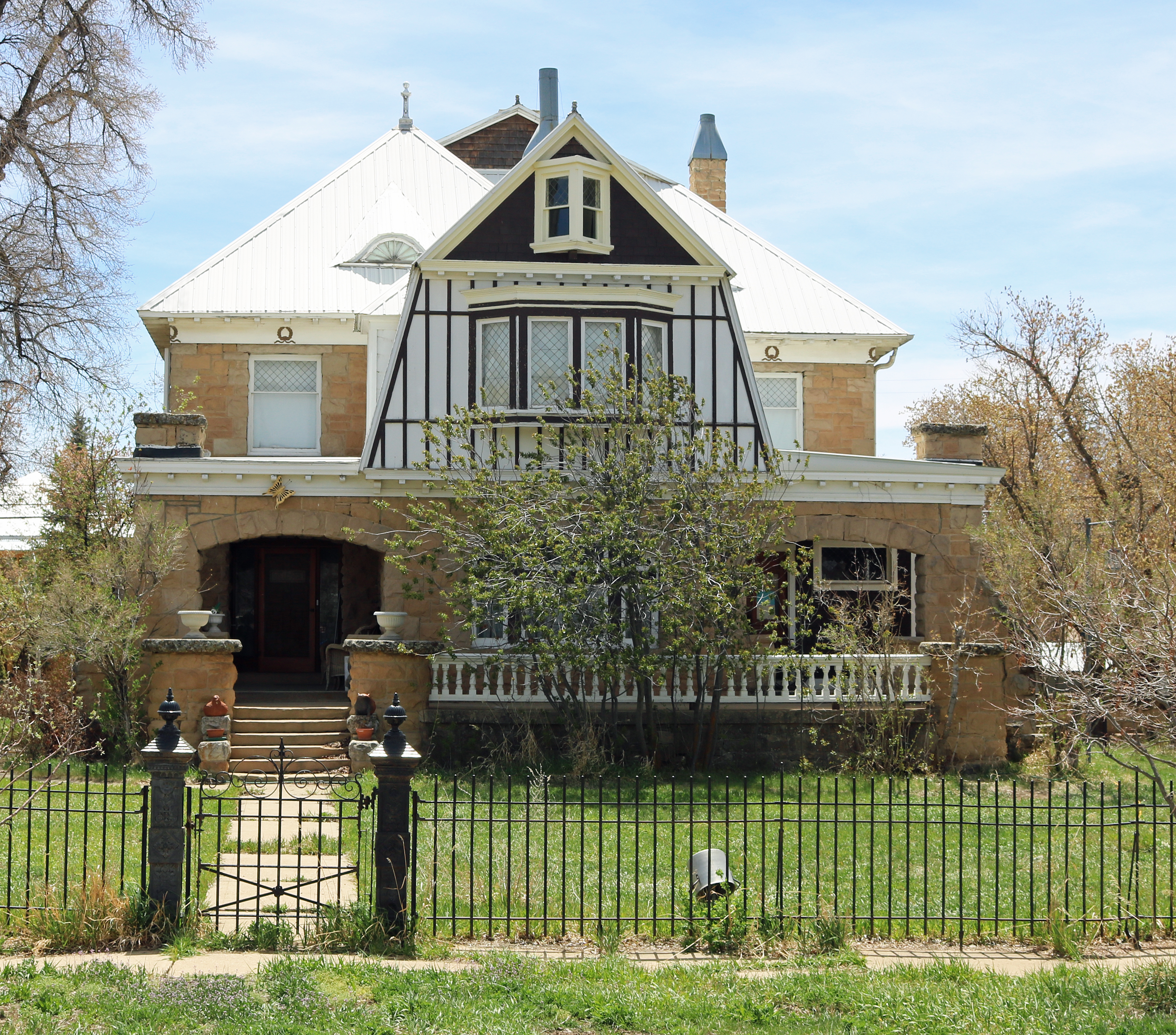
Wrightsman House in 2020

The Wrightsman House, formerly known as Wrightsman Hotel, is a two-and-a-half-story eclectic stone house built in 1903 and listed on the National Register of Historic Places in 1997 as an example of late Victorian architecture. Originally designed to be a residence and hospital, it became a hotel in 1917, and was converted into a bed and breakfast in 1995.

== Geography ==
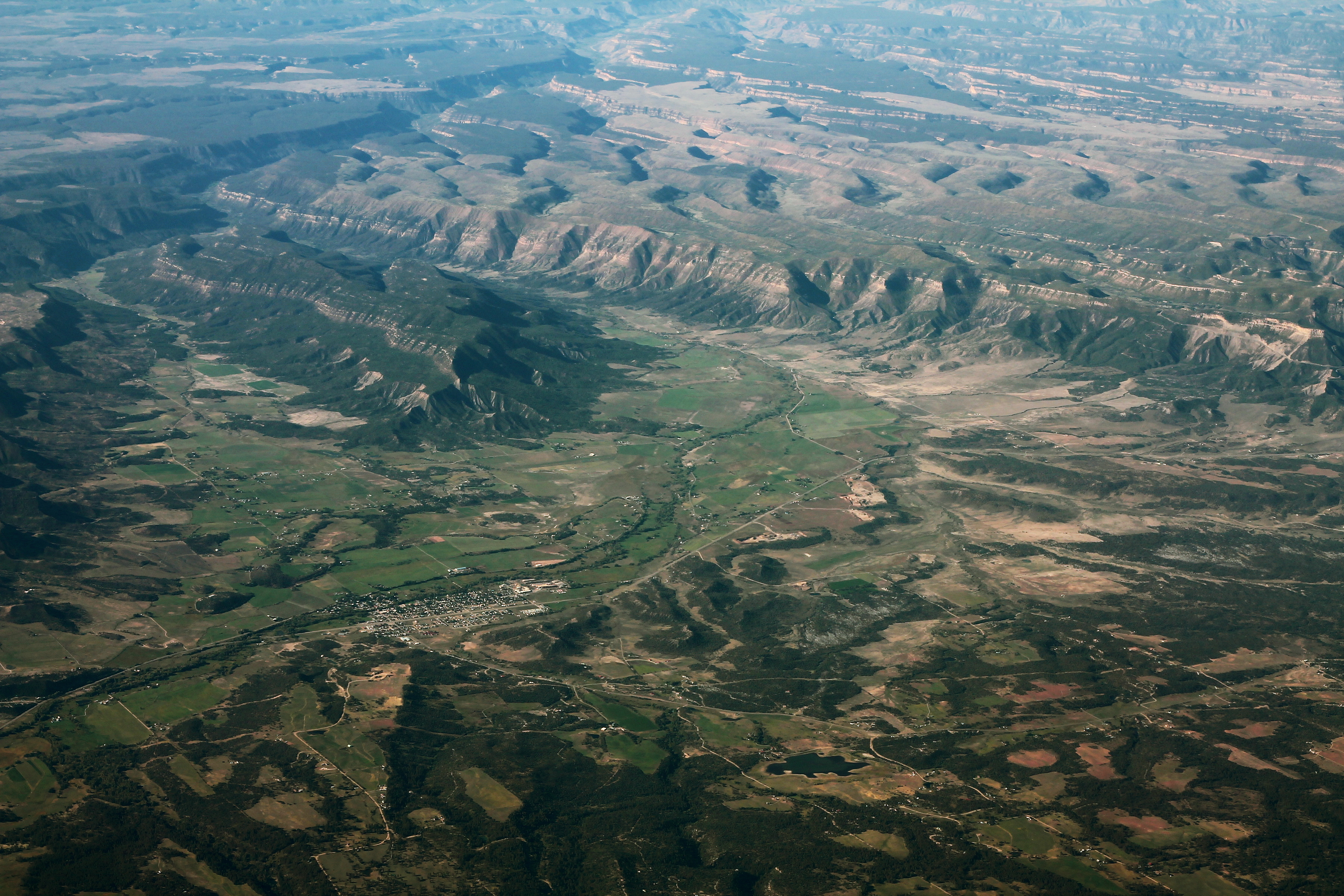
Aerial view of Mancos and surrounding areas

Mancos is located in eastern Montezuma County.

According to the United States Census Bureau, Mancos has a total area of 0.6 square miles (1.6 km^{2}), all of it recorded as land. The town is located in the Mancos River valley at an elevation of approximately 7,000 feet (2,100 m). The Mancos River was named by Spanish explorers (Rio de los Mancos - "River of the Sleeve") perhaps for the way the river, which rises in the La Plata Mountains northeast of Mancos, drains the valley and then flows into the narrow confines of Weber Canyon and Mancos Canyon, southwest of Mesa Verde, where it joins the San Juan River. The town's skyline is dominated by the mass of Mesa Verde 7 miles (11 km) to the west, Menefee Mountain 2 miles (3 km) to the southeast, and the La Plata Mountains, a range to the east and northeast, in which the headwaters of the Mancos River originate.

Originally laid out as a railroad town, Mancos stretches for approximately a mile along the river and on both sides of it, while newer areas lie north of the old railroad alignment (now U.S. Route 160, part of the San Juan Skyway and the Old Spanish Trail). The small main business district lies along Business Route 160 (Grand Avenue), while newer business areas are located along the main highway. The highly publicized death of a schoolchild in 2003 led to a major reconstruction of US 160 through the town in following years, creating a street pattern which somewhat hampers development. US 160 leads west 18 miles (29 km) to Cortez, the Montezuma county seat, and east 27 miles (43 km) to Durango. Colorado State Highway 184 leads northwest from Mancos 18 miles (29 km) to Dolores.

The Mancos River flows from east to west through the town, and then flows to the south into Mancos Canyon, on the west and south toe of Mesa Verde. Much of the townsite is located in a Special Flood Hazard Area (the 100-year floodplain)), including most bridges connecting the two parts of the town.

5 miles (8 km) northeast of town is Mancos State Park located on Jackson Gulch Reservoir, built by the Mancos Irrigation Project. Echo Basin, a winter (Nordic) skiing area and various vacation resorts and dude ranches, as well as an elk ranch and other tourist-, sports-, and hunting-related activities are located in and around the town.

As is common in Colorado, many government services are provided by special districts, both inside the corporate limits of the town of Mancos and outside in the county. Among these are the Mancos Library District, Mancos Water Conservancy District and Mancos Fire Protection District (which also provides emergency medical services). The nearest hospitals are Southwest Memorial Hospital in Cortez (approximately 18 mi or 29 km west) and Mercy Regional Medical Center in Durango, approximately 34 mi or 55 km east. The town does have a medical clinic, funded through a variety of private and public sources.

The nearest general aviation and commercial airport is located southwest of Cortez, approximately 22 miles (35 km) west of Mancos. There are a few private airstrips in the vicinity of Mancos, but these are not open to the public; a former town airfield near Jackson Gulch Reservoir is sometimes still marked on maps.

=== Climate ===
Climate data for Mancos, Colorado (1991–2020 normals, extremes 1898–1919, 1990–present)
Month	Jan	Feb	Mar	Apr	May	Jun	Jul	Aug	Sep	Oct	Nov	Dec	Year
Record high °F (°C)	64 (18)	67 (19)	83 (28)	82 (28)	92 (33)	96 (36)	96 (36)	96 (36)	93 (34)	84 (29)	72 (22)	64 (18)	96 (36)
Mean maximum °F (°C)	52.0 (11.1)	56.2 (13.4)	66.8 (19.3)	73.7 (23.2)	81.9 (27.7)	89.8 (32.1)	92.6 (33.7)	89.0 (31.7)	84.9 (29.4)	76.3 (24.6)	65.6 (18.7)	54.2 (12.3)	92.9 (33.8)
Mean daily maximum °F (°C)	40.0 (4.4)	43.7 (6.5)	52.9 (11.6)	60.8 (16.0)	69.9 (21.1)	80.8 (27.1)	85.0 (29.4)	82.3 (27.9)	75.1 (23.9)	63.9 (17.7)	51.0 (10.6)	40.5 (4.7)	62.2 (16.8)
Daily mean °F (°C)	26.2 (−3.2)	30.3 (−0.9)	37.8 (3.2)	44.3 (6.8)	52.4 (11.3)	61.8 (16.6)	67.8 (19.9)	65.9 (18.8)	58.3 (14.6)	47.4 (8.6)	36.3 (2.4)	27.3 (−2.6)	46.3 (7.9)
Mean daily minimum °F (°C)	12.4 (−10.9)	17.0 (−8.3)	22.7 (−5.2)	27.8 (−2.3)	34.9 (1.6)	42.8 (6.0)	50.5 (10.3)	49.4 (9.7)	41.6 (5.3)	31.0 (−0.6)	21.5 (−5.8)	14.0 (−10.0)	30.5 (−0.8)
Mean minimum °F (°C)	−5.4 (−20.8)	−1.1 (−18.4)	7.3 (−13.7)	15.3 (−9.3)	23.2 (−4.9)	31.9 (−0.1)	42.1 (5.6)	42.2 (5.7)	29.2 (−1.6)	16.3 (−8.7)	4.4 (−15.3)	−5.3 (−20.7)	−8.8 (−22.7)
Record low °F (°C)	−24 (−31)	−26 (−32)	−7 (−22)	1 (−17)	11 (−12)	21 (−6)	30 (−1)	30 (−1)	16 (−9)	1 (−17)	−9 (−23)	−21 (−29)	−26 (−32)
Average precipitation inches (mm)	1.38 (35)	1.27 (32)	1.14 (29)	1.04 (26)	1.04 (26)	0.58 (15)	1.64 (42)	1.79 (45)	1.90 (48)	1.42 (36)	1.22 (31)	1.25 (32)	15.67 (398)
Average snowfall inches (cm)	14.7 (37)	12.8 (33)	6.6 (17)	3.5 (8.9)	0.9 (2.3)	0.0 (0.0)	0.0 (0.0)	0.0 (0.0)	0.0 (0.0)	0.6 (1.5)	5.2 (13)	12.8 (33)	57.1 (145)
Average precipitation days (≥ 0.01 in)	7.6	7.4	6.5	5.6	6.0	3.6	9.6	10.5	7.5	6.3	5.5	7.0	83.1
Average snowy days (≥ 0.1 in)	5.8	4.7	3.3	1.5	0.4	0.0	0.0	0.0	0.0	0.3	2.6	5.2	23.8
Source: NOAA

== Demographics ==
Historical population
Census	Pop.	Note	%±
1900	383		—
1910	567		48.0%
1920	682		20.3%
1930	646		−5.3%
1940	748		15.8%
1950	785		4.9%
1960	832		6.0%
1970	709		−14.8%
1980	870		22.7%
1990	842		−3.2%
2000	1,119		32.9%
2010	1,336		19.4%
2020	1,196		−10.5%
U.S. Decennial Census

=== 2020 census ===
As of the 2020 census, Mancos had a population of 1,196. The population density was 1,868.75 inhabitants per square mile (721.53/km^{2}). There were 588 housing units at an average density of 918.75 per square mile (354.73/km^{2}).

The median age was 40.7 years. 20.0% of residents were under the age of 18 and 19.5% were 65 years of age or older. For every 100 females, there were 87.5 males, and for every 100 females age 18 and over there were 85.5 males.

0.0% of residents lived in urban areas, while 100.0% lived in rural areas.

There were 527 households, of which 31.3% had children under the age of 18 living in them. Of all households, 35.1% were married-couple households, 19.5% were households with a male householder and no spouse or partner present, and 35.7% were households with a female householder and no spouse or partner present. About 31.7% of all households were made up of individuals, and 15.6% had someone living alone who was 65 years of age or older.

Of the 588 housing units, 10.4% were vacant. The homeowner vacancy rate was 0.9% and the rental vacancy rate was 7.5%.

Racial composition as of the 2020 census
Race	Number	Percent
White	964	80.6%
Black or African American	7	0.6%
American Indian and Alaska Native	53	4.4%
Asian	3	0.3%
Native Hawaiian and Other Pacific Islander	0	0.0%
Some other race	53	4.4%
Two or more races	116	9.7%
Hispanic or Latino (of any race)	181	15.1%

=== 2010 census ===
As of the census of 2010, there were 1,336 people, 546 households, and 320 families residing in the town. The population density was 2,227.41 inhabitants per square mile (860.01/km^{2}). There were 608 housing units at an average density of 950 units per square mile (370 units/km^{2}). The racial makeup was 1,141 (85.4%) White, 1 (0.1%) Black or African American, 84 (6.3%) Native American, 9 (0.7%) Asian, 4 (0.3%) Pacific Islander, 56 (4.2%) from other races, and 41 (3.1%) from two or more races. There were 164 (12.3%) of Hispanic or Latino ancestry, of any race.

1,263 people (94.5% of the population) lived in households, 73 (5.5%) lived in non-institutionalized group quarters, and none were institutionalized.

There were 546 households, out of which 191 (35.0%) had children under the age of 18 living with them, 209 (38.3%) were opposite-sex married couples living together, 44 (8.1%) unmarried opposite-sex partnerships, and 3 (0.5%) same-sex married couples or partnerships. 81 (14.8%) had a female householder with no husband present, and 30 (5.5%) had a male householder with no wife present. 226 (14.4%) were non-families. 184 (33.7%) of all households were made up of individuals, and 66 (12.1%) had someone living alone who was 65 years of age or older. The average household size was 2.31 and the average family size was 3.01.

In the town, the population was spread out, with 356 (26.6%) under the age of 18, 67 (5.0%) aged 18 to 24, 363 (27.2%) aged 25 to 44, 341 (25.5%) aged 45 to 64, and 209 (15.6%) who were 65 years of age or older. The median age was 38 years. For every 100 females, there were 87.9 males. For every 100 females age 18 and over, there were 81.8 males.

=== 2000 census ===
As of the census of 2000, there were 1,119 people, 478 households, and 292 families residing in the town. The population density was 1,938.4 inhabitants per square mile (748.4/km^{2}). There were 524 housing units at an average density of 907.7 units per square mile (350.5 units/km^{2}). The racial makeup of the town was 88.65% White, 2.23% Native American, 0.09% Pacific Islander, 7.86% from other races, and 1.16% from two or more races. Hispanic or Latino of any race were 12.42% of the population.

There were 478 households, out of which 32.0% had children under the age of 18 living with them, 43.7% were married couples living together, 13.2% had a female householder with no husband present, and 38.9% were non-families. 33.7% of all households were made up of individuals, and 13.2% had someone living alone who was 65 years of age or older. The average household size was 2.31 and the average family size was 2.93.

In the town, the population was spread out, with 25.8% under the age of 18, 9.0% from 18 to 24, 26.1% from 25 to 44, 25.5% from 45 to 64, and 13.6% who were 65 years of age or older. The median age was 38 years. For every 100 females, there were 93.6 males. For every 100 females age 18 and over, there were 89.5 males.

The median income for a household in the town was $25,223, and the median income for a family was $32,188. Males had a median income of $27,708 versus $17,292 for females. The per capita income for the town was $13,946. About 11.8% of families and 16.1% of the population were below the poverty line, including 22.5% of those under age 18 and 15.5% of those age 65 or over.

== Transportation ==
Mancos is part of Colorado's Bustang network. It is on the Durango-Grand Junction Outrider line.

== Education ==
It is in the Mancos School District RE-6.

== Notable people ==
- Luther Elliss, former NFL Pro Bowl defensive end
- Veryl Goodnight, painter and sculptor
- Jaye P. Morgan, retired singer, born in Mancos in 1931
- Louisa Wade Wetherill, explorer and trader

== Sister city ==
Mancos has a sister city, as designated by Sister Cities International:

- Feins, Ille-et-Vilaine, Brittany, France

== See also ==
- Mesa Verde National Park and UNESCO World Heritage Site
- Old Spanish National Historic Trail
