= Cortez Municipal Airport =

Airport in Colorado, United States

- IATA: CEZ; ICAO: KCEZ; FAA LID: CEZ

Summary
- Airport type: Public
- Owner: City of Cortez
- Serves: Cortez, Colorado
- Elevation AMSL: 5,918 ft (1,804 m)
- Coordinates: 37°18′11″N 108°37′41″W
- Website: CEZ Website

Map
- Location within Colorado Location within the United States

Runways
Direction	Length		Surface
Direction	ft	m	Surface
3/21	7,205	2,196	Asphalt

Statistics (2019)
- Aircraft operations: 9,834
- Based aircraft: 26
- Source: Federal Aviation Administration

Cortez Municipal Airport (IATA: CEZ, ICAO: KCEZ, FAA LID: CEZ) (Montezuma County Airport) is three miles (4.8 km) southwest of Cortez, in Montezuma County, Colorado, United States. It has passenger service from one airline: Key Lime Air DBA Denver Air Connection.

== History ==
Its first scheduled passenger airline flights were operated by Monarch Airlines (1946-1950) with Douglas DC-3s in 1949. By 1977, Monarch successor Frontier Airlines (1950-1986) was operating Convair 580 turboprop service direct to Albuquerque and Denver as well as nonstop to nearby Farmington. Frontier had ceased serving Cortez by 1982.

Following cessation of service by Frontier, Cortez was served by several commuter air carriers over the years. During the mid-1980s, two airlines were serving the airport: Pioneer Airlines operating code sharing flights as Continental Express on behalf of Continental Airlines with direct service from Denver via a stop in Grand Junction flown with Fairchild Swearingen Metroliner commuter propjets, and Trans-Colorado Airlines operating independently with direct service from Denver via a stop in Durango also flown with Fairchild Swearingen Metroliner aircraft. In 1989, Mesa Airlines was the only air carrier serving Cortez with nonstop flights from Denver and direct flights from Albuquerque via a stop in Farmington both operated with Beechcraft commuter turboprops. By 1995, Mesa Airlines was operating code sharing flights as United Express on behalf of United Airlines with nonstop service from Denver and Farmington flown with Beechcraft 1900D and Embraer EMB-120 Brasilia commuter propjets. In 2000, Great Lakes Airlines was operating code sharing service as United Express on behalf of United Airlines with nonstop Beechcraft 1900D flights to Denver. Great Lakes Airlines then operated nonstop Beechcraft 1900D service primarily to Denver as an independent air carrier from 2001 through 2016.

=== U-2 Emergency Landing Incident ===
A USAF Lockheed U-2 reconnaissance aircraft made an emergency nighttime forced landing at the Cortez Municipal Airport on August 3, 1959. Major Hsi-Chun Mike Hua was on a training flight originating at Laughlin AFB, Texas. The U-2 aircraft engine flamed out at 70,000 feet. Maj. Hua established glide and was able to navigate through a valley to a lighted airport that wasn't on his map, nor did he know of its existence beforehand. The airport was the only one in the area with a runway that was lighted overnight.

== Facilities ==
Cortez Municipal Airport covers 622 acres (252 ha) at an elevation of 5,918 feet (1,804 m). Its one runway, 3/21, is 7,205 by 100 feet (2,196 x 30 m) asphalt.

In 2019 the airport had 9,834 aircraft operations, average 27 per day: 86% general aviation, 13% air taxi, and <1% military. 26 aircraft were then based at the airport: 85% single-engine, 1% multi-engine, and <1% helicopter. The airport is an uncontrolled airport and has no control tower.

== Airline and destinations ==
Airlines	Destinations
Denver Air Connection	Denver, Phoenix–Sky Harbor

Denver Air Connection currently operates Fairchild Swearingen Metroliner turboprop aircraft on its flights serving Cortez.

== Statistics ==
Passenger boardings (enplanements) by year, as per the FAA
Year	2009	2010	2011	2012	2013	2014	2015	2016	2017	2018	2019
Enplanements	7,698	6,342	6,989	7,548	8,218	3,835	2,303	4,564	7,890	8,045	8,719
Change	▼8.37%	▼17.61%	▲10.20%	▲8.00%	▲8.88%	▼53.33%	▼39.95%	▲98.18%	▲72.87%	▲1.96%	▲8.38%
Airline	Great Lakes Airlines	Great Lakes Airlines	Great Lakes Airlines	Great Lakes Airlines	Great Lakes Airlines	Great Lakes Airlines	Great Lakes Airlines	Great Lakes Airlines	Boutique Air	Boutique Air	Boutique Air
Destination(s)	Denver	Denver	Denver	Denver	Denver Prescott	Denver	Denver	Denver Page	Denver Phoenix	Denver Phoenix	Denver Phoenix Telluride

== See also ==
- List of airports in Colorado

== Other sources ==
- Essential Air Service documents (Docket OST-1998-3508) from the U.S. Department of Transportation:
  - Order 2006-7-19: selecting Great Lakes Aviation, Ltd. to provide subsidized essential air service (EAS) at Alamosa and Cortez, Colorado for two years, beginning August 1, 2006. Alamosa will receive three nonstop round trips to Denver each weekday and weekend (18 total round trips per week) at an annual subsidy rate of $1,150,268. Cortez will receive three nonstop round trips to Denver each weekday and weekend at an annual subsidy rate of $796,577. Each community will be served with 19-passenger Beech 1900-D aircraft.
  - Order 2008-5-24: reselecting Great Lakes Aviation, Ltd., d/b/a United Express, to provide essential air service (EAS) at annual subsidy rates of $1,853,475 at Alamosa, Colorado, and $1,295,562 at Cortez, through July 31, 2010.
  - Order 2010-7-5: selecting Great Lakes Aviation, Ltd., to continue providing subsidized essential air service (EAS) at Alamosa and Cortez, Colorado, for the two-year period beginning August 1, 2010, at the annual subsidy rates of $1,987,155 and $1,847,657, respectively.
  - https://denverairconnection.com/scheduled-flights/
