= Ute Mountain =

Mountain in Colorado, US

Ute Peak
- Ute Mountain
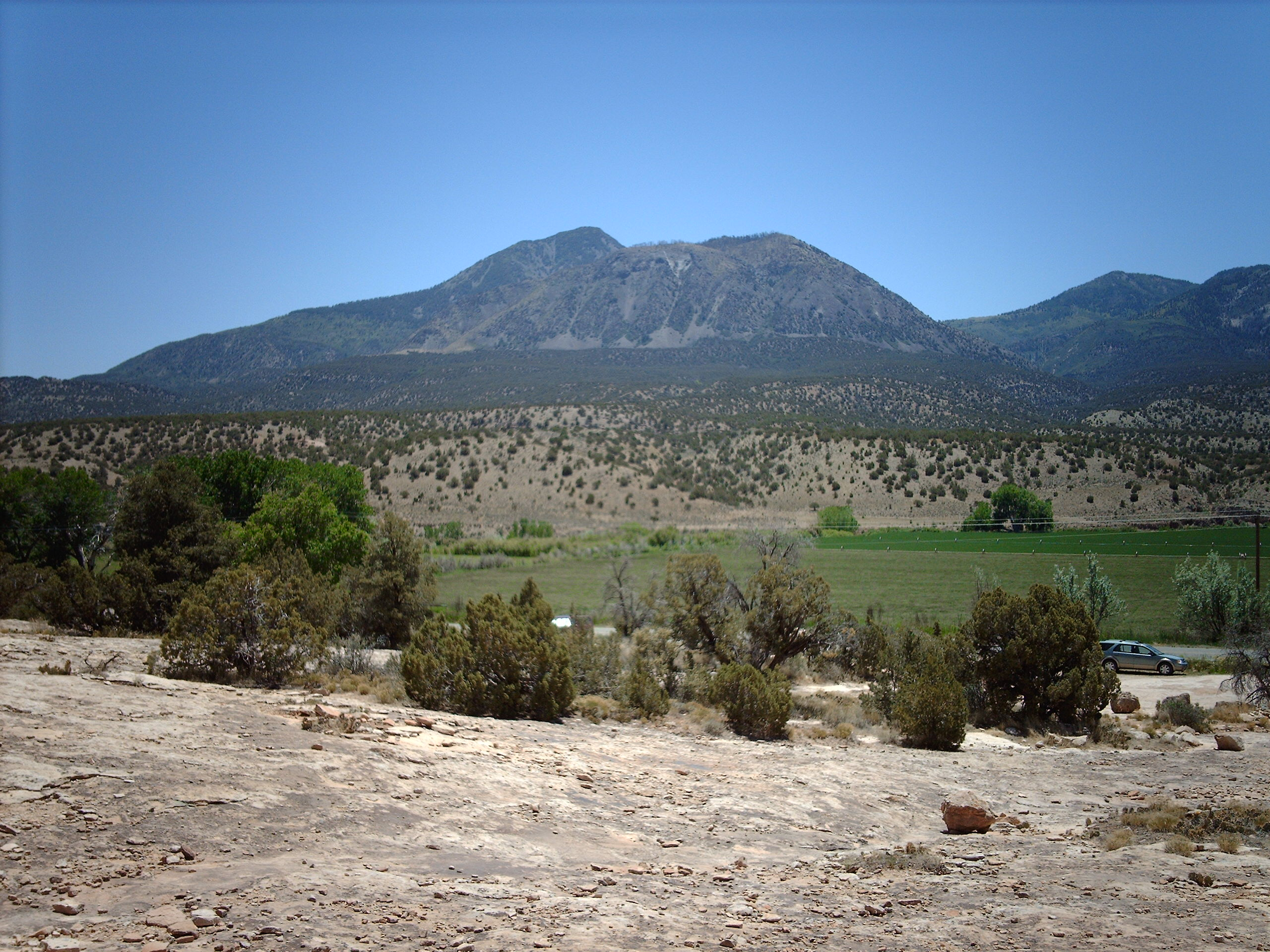
- Ute Peak from the north.

Highest point
- Elevation: 9,984 ft (3,043 m)
- Prominence: 4,039 ft (1,231 m)
- Isolation: 34.27 mi (55.15 km)
- Listing: Colorado prominent summits Colorado range high points
- Coordinates: 37°17′03″N 108°46′43″W

Geography
- Location within Colorado
- Location: Ute Mountain Ute Tribe Reservation, Montezuma County, Colorado, United States
- Parent range: Ute Mountains
- Topo map(s): USGS 7.5' topographic map Battle Rock, Colorado

Ute Mountain, also known as Ute Peak or Sleeping Ute Mountain (/ˈjuːt/; Ute-Southern Paiute: Wisuv Káruv (Note: Or Ute-Southern Paiute: Wíisi-kyarʉ-rʉ-, Wiisi-kaa＝pɨ; Navajo: Dził Naajiní; Tewa: Phaa P’in)), is a peak within the Ute Mountains, a small mountain range in the southwestern corner of Colorado. It is on the northern edge of the Ute Mountain Ute Tribe Reservation. The Reservation forms the southwestern corner of the state and of Montezuma County.

Nomenclature for this peak and its range varies. The highest peak is sometimes known as Sleeping Ute Mountain; the entire range is also identified as one large mountain, called Sleeping Ute Mountain, on some maps; and the range is sometimes called the Sleeping Ute Mountains. All of these forms of the mountain's name and of the range's name can be found on various USGS maps, databases and reports.

The Ute Mountains, with a collective profile commonly known as "The Sleeping Ute", are a dense cluster of peaks approximately 5 by 12 miles (8 by 19 km) in extent and stand in isolation from other mountains. Despite being much lower than Colorado's highest peaks, Ute Mountain is the eighth most topographically prominent peak in the state, due to this isolation. It is also notable for its large local relief in all directions, especially its rise of roughly 4,250 ft (1,295 m) over the Montezuma Valley to the southeast.

The Sleeping Ute is said to resemble a Ute chief lying on his back with arms folded across his chest. The mountains were valued as a sacred place by the Weeminuche Ute band. It is still a sacred place to their descendants, the Ute Mountain Ute Tribe, and still plays a role in their ceremonies as indicated by the "Sundance Ground" on some topographical maps nestled between The Knees and Horse Peak (ribcage).

Originally, the northern part of the mountains were outside the reservation boundaries as reduced following a series of treaties in the late 19th century, but a trade of land now in Mesa Verde National Park, approximately 15 miles (24 km) east, for federal land on the mountain, allowed the reservation boundary to be extended north to McElmo Creek and encompass the entire mountain range. In particular, this means that recreational access to the range by outsiders is severely restricted. Few roads or trails are found in the mountains, although radio towers and water tanks have been built, and a road along Cottonwood Wash from Towaoc nearly reaches the summit of Ute Peak.

== Legend ==
A Ute Indian legend describes the Sleeping Ute as the sleeping form of a "Great Warrior God who was also known as a chief" who fell asleep while recovering from wounds received in a great battle with "the Evil Ones". Various other forms of the legend can be found.

== Visual profile ==
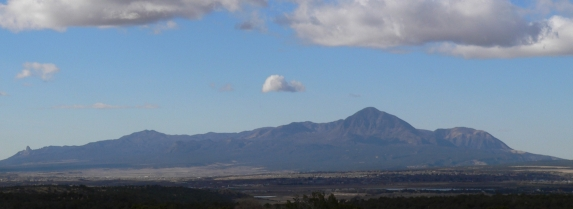
The Sleeping Ute Mountains viewed from ~20 miles east northeast.

Readily recognized from many spots up to 50 miles (80 km) east or west (e.g. the Four Corners Monument and parts of Mesa Verde National Park), the profile is best seen from 15 to 25 miles (24 to 40 km) somewhat north of east of the mountains as in the accompanying photograph.

Easily identified features of the profile include the following (north to south):

- Head - the profile of Marble Mountain provides readily recognized facial features while a feathered headdress can be seen tapering north from Black Mountain and Marble Mountain.
- Crossed Arms – Ute Peak is the highest, the most prominent and easternmost peak in the Ute Mountains
- Ribcage – Horse Mountain to the east and the twin peaks Black Mountain/Ute Mountain to the west form a recognizable ribcage.
- Knees – Hermano Mountain or "The Knees" are obviously the knees of the figure.
- Toes –
  - East Toe is a relatively small, sharp and prominent igneous protrusion at the south-eastern end of the Ute Mountains proportioned and perfectly placed to complete the figure from the east.
  - West Toe, a second protrusion, has a very similar profile and is perfectly placed to complete the figure from the west.

The illusion of a reclining figure is further reinforced by its symmetry. The figure is nearly as complete seen from the west as from the east.

== Region ==
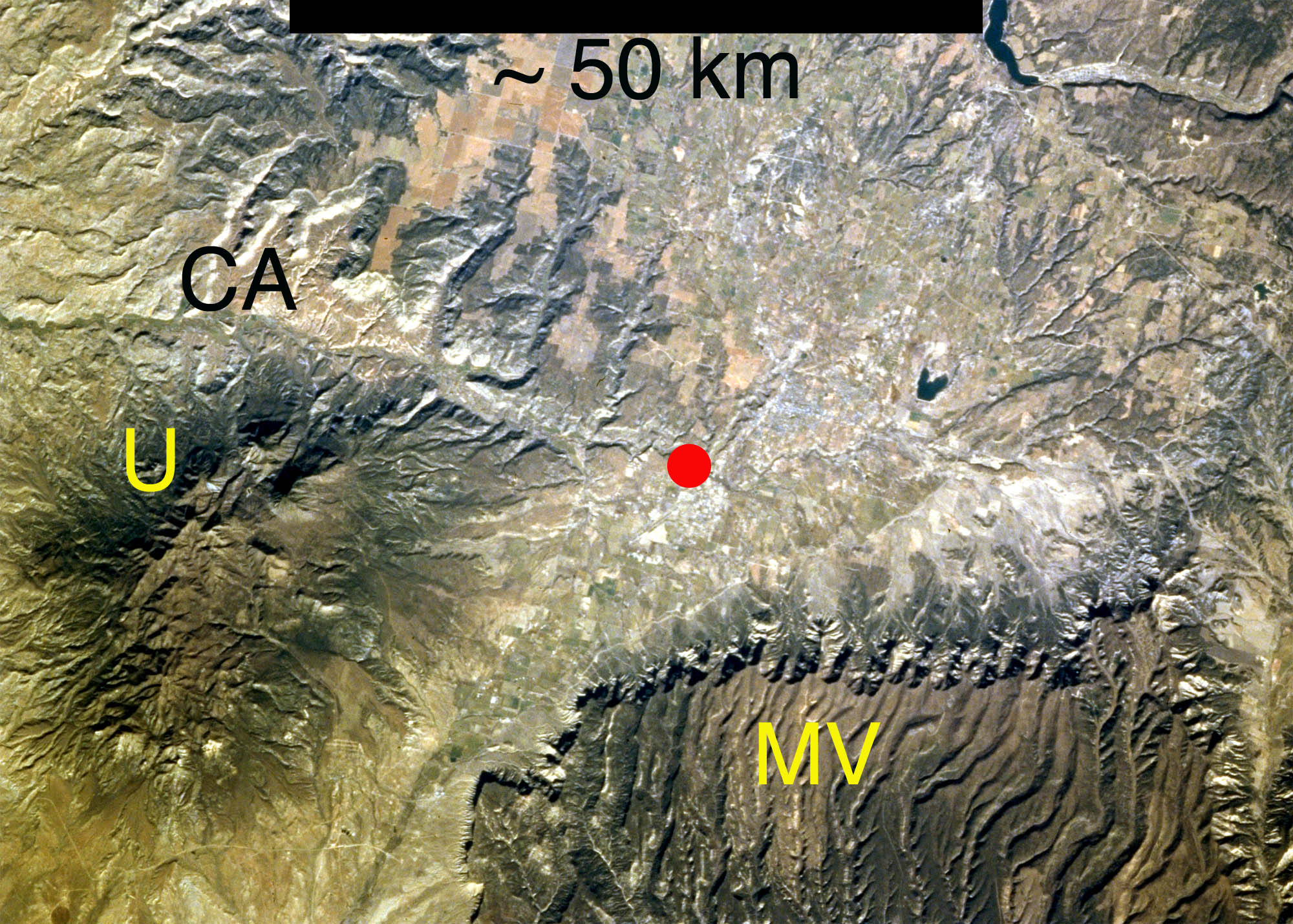
Ute Mountain (U), just west of Cortez, Colorado (red dot) and Mesa Verde National Park (MV), and separated from Canyons of the Ancients National Monument (CA) to the north by McElmo Creek.

Though on the southwestern fringe of the original Rocky Mountain home of the Ute Tribe, the Sleeping Ute is the most prominent feature of the high-desert Ute Mountain Ute Reservation. The only town on the Reservation, Towaoc, lies at the feet of the figure and is home to most of the Reservation's population. As the Reservation capital, Towaoc is the Ute Mountain Ute tribal headquarters.

Cortez, the largest town in the area with a population of over 8000, lies outside the reservation 11.5 miles (18.5 km) east-northeast of Ute Peak. The elevation of Cortez is 6,200 feet (1,890 m) and can be considered the base elevation of the Ute Mountains.

The Ute Mountain Ute Tribal Park adjoins Mesa Verde National Park to the east of the mountains. The western boundary of Mesa Verde National Park is 12 miles (19 km) east of Ute Peak. The Mesa and the Sleeping Ute share equal prominence as regional landmarks.

McElmo Creek and Canyon Of The Ancients National Monument form the northern terminus of the Ute Mountains and the Reservation.

== Geology ==
The Ute Mountains were formed by intrusion of igneous rocks at about 72 million years (Late Cretaceous), concurrent doming, and subsequent erosion. The most common type of igneous rock is porphyritic hornblende diorite, but rock types present range from gabbro to granite. Forms of intrusions include laccoliths, stocks, dikes, and sills. One dike extends north to McElmo Creek and can be examined at a roadside there. The igneous rocks intrude a sedimentary section of Jurassic and Cretaceous rocks and the youngest rocks intruded are in the Point Lookout Sandstone.

The intrusions are similar in form and rock type to those in other Colorado Plateau mountain ranges, such as the La Plata Mountains to the northeast of here, and the Rico Mountains north of Dolores, Colorado in Colorado, and the Henry Mountains, the La Sal Mountains and the Abajo Mountains, all to the west in Utah. The intrusions at these three Utah occurrences are younger at about 20 to 30 million years in age. The Ute Mountains and the similar Carrizo Mountains, nearby in Arizona, lie within a southwest extension of the Colorado Mineral Belt, but no ore deposits are known to be associated with these igneous rocks.

Sedimentary units are listed below, from youngest to oldest:

Formations of Cretaceous age

- Point Lookout Sandstone (the oldest formation of the Mesa Verde Group)
- Mancos Shale
- Dakota Sandstone
- Burro Canyon Formation

Formations of Jurassic age

- Morrison Formation
- Bluff Sandstone (formerly called the Junction Creek Sandstone)
- Summerville Formation
- Entrada Sandstone
- Navajo Sandstone

In some areas the soft lower unit of the Entrada weathers into characteristic rounded forms, commonly called hoodoos. The underlying Navajo weathers into rough, rounded surfaces, commonly pitted, and usually forms cliffs.

== See also ==
- List of Colorado mountain ranges
- List of Colorado mountain summits
  - List of Colorado fourteeners
  - List of Colorado 4000 meter prominent summits
  - List of the most prominent summits of Colorado
- List of Colorado county high points
