= Montezuma-Cortez School District RE-1 =

School district in Cortez, Colorado, United States

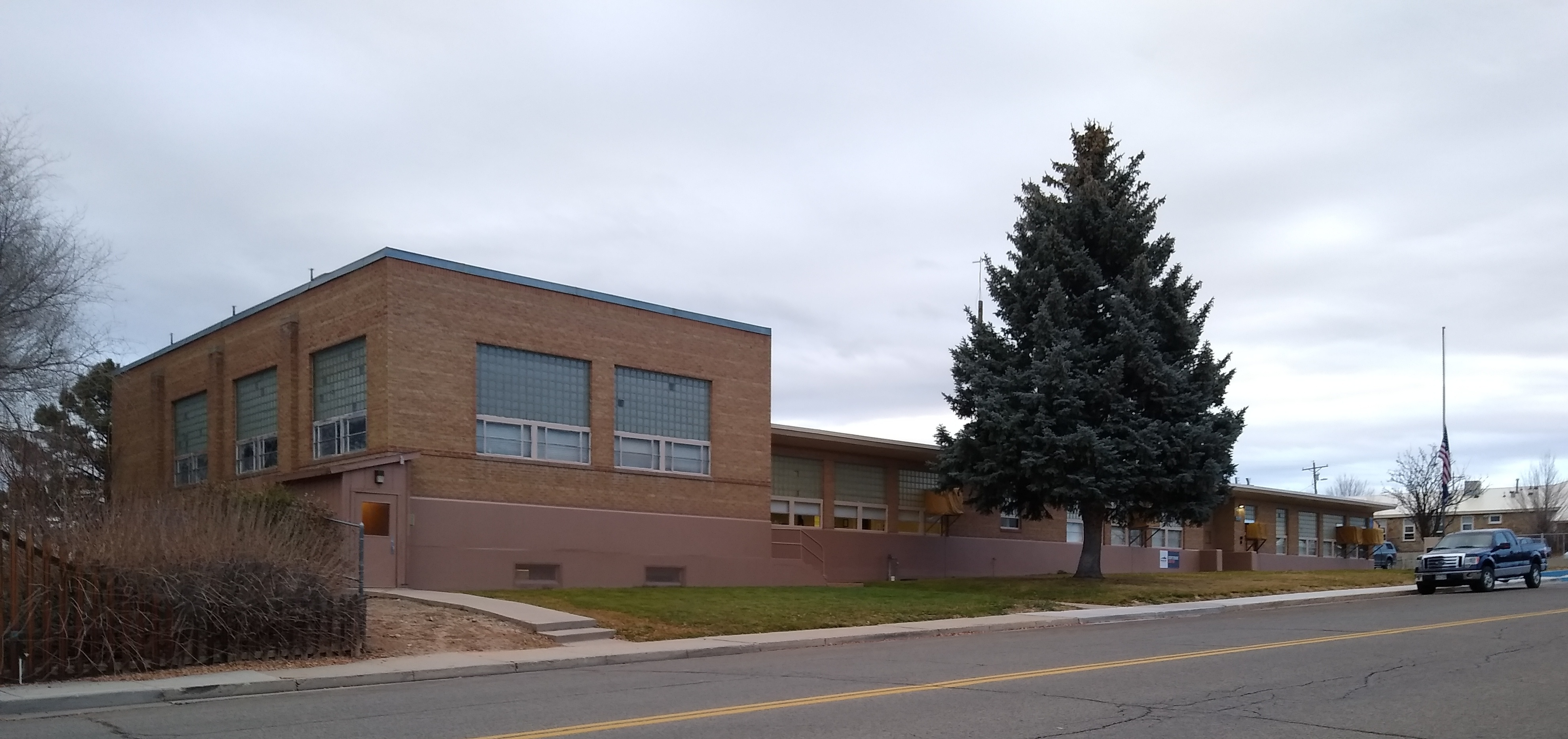
- District administration offices

Address
- 400 North Elm Street Cortez, Colorado, 81321; United States
- Coordinates: 37°21′10.25″N 108°35′15.12″W

District information
- Grades: Pre-school - 12
- Superintendent: Tom Burris

Students and staff
- Enrollment: 2,929
- District mascot: Panthers

Other information
- Website: www.cortez.k12.co.us

The Montezuma-Cortez School District RE-1 is a public school district headquartered in Cortez, Colorado, United States.

The district is entirely in Montezuma County and includes Cortez, Lewis, and Towaoc.

== Schools ==
The Montezuma-Cortez School District RE-1 has one preschool, five elementary schools, one middle school and one high school. In addition, it serves three charter schools.

| School | Grades | Enrollment (2018–2019) | Website |
|---|---|---|---|
| Battlerock Charter School | K–6 | 68 | |
| Beech Street Pre-School | Preschool | 92 | |
| Children's Kiva Montessori | K–8 | 111 | |
| Kemper Elementary School | K–5 | 369 | |
| Lewis-Arriola Elementary School | K–5 | 128 | |
| Manaugh Elementary School | K–5 | 258 | |
| Mesa Elementary School | K–5 | 346 | |
| Montezuma-Cortez High School | 9–12 | 667 | |
| Montezuma-Cortez Middle School | 6–8 | 574 | |
| Pleasant View Elementary School | K–5 | 31 | |
| Southwest Open School | 9–12 | 134 | |
