= Larry Brunson =

American football player (born 1949)

No. 83, 81, 82
- Position: Wide receiver

Personal information
- Born: August 11, 1949 (age 77); Little Rock, Arkansas, U.S.
- Listed height: 5 ft 11 in (1.80 m)
- Listed weight: 180 lb (82 kg)

Career information
- High school: Montezuma-Cortez (Cortez, Colorado)
- College: Mesa (CO), Colorado
- NFL draft: 1972: 11th round, 263rd overall pick

Career history
- Denver Broncos (1972)*; New England Patriots (1973)*; Kansas City Chiefs (1974–1977); Oakland Raiders (1978–1979); Denver Broncos (1980)
- * Offseason or practice squad member only

Career NFL statistics
- Receptions: 104
- Receiving yards: 1,787
- Touchdowns: 6
- Stats at Pro Football Reference

Larry Rudolph Brunson (born August 11, 1949) is an American former professional football player who was a wide receiver in the National Football League (NFL). He played for the Kansas City Chiefs, Oakland Raiders, and Denver Broncos between 1974 and 1980. He played college football for the Colorado Buffaloes. He is the father of former minor league baseball player Matt Brunson.

Brunson attended Cortez High School in Cortez, Colorado and then Mesa College—now known as Colorado Mesa University—in Grand Junction, Colorado and the University of Colorado Boulder.

He was selected by the Denver Broncos in the 11th round of the 1972 NFL draft.

Brunson finished his NFL career with 104 receptions and 1787 yards, for an average of 17.2 yards a catch. He scored a total of six touchdowns and his career long reception was 84 yards, which he accomplished in his rookie season. He fumbled the ball seven times in his career.

He rushed the ball 12 times in his career for 104 yards. He averaged 5.2 yards a rush.
