= Hsi-Chun Mike Hua =

Hsi-Chun "Mike" Hua (Chinese: 華錫鈞; 6 December 1925 – 24 January 2017) was a Republic of China Air Force general and military aviator who played a leading role in the development of the Air Force and of aeronautics in Taiwan. He was known in Taiwan as "the father of the Indigenous Defense Fighter", a reference to the Taiwanese built AIDC F-CK-1 Ching-kuo fighter jet.

Hua was born on 6 December 1925 in Wuxi, China. After immigrating to Taiwan during the Retreat of the government of the Republic of China to Taiwan as a result of the 1949 Chinese Civil War, he graduated from the Republic of China Air Force Academy and qualified to fly the F-86 Sabre. He then attended the US Air Force Lockheed U-2 pilot training academy.

On August 3, 1959, during his seventh U-2 training flight, Hua was the hero of a famous aviation incident. Thirteen miles above Utah, he lost engine power. Flying dead stick, he located the Cortez Municipal Airport and successfully landed his U-2, a notoriously difficult plane to land even in the best of circumstances.

After his return to Taiwan, Hua flew covert reconnaissance missions over People's Republic of China airspace flying U-2 spy plane as a member of the ROC Air Force 35th Black Cat Squadron.

In 1964, he enrolled in the aeronautics engineering at Purdue University, from which he received both a master's degree (1965) and a PhD (1968) in aerodynamics. After working at Cessna and Lockheed Aircraft, Hua returned to Taiwan in 1970 to lead the Aero Industry Development Center, where he helped to develop the AT-3 jet trainer and the Indigenous Defense Fighter.

During his military career, Hua served as an adjunct faculty member at National Cheng Kung University and Tunghai University. In 1982, he was promoted to general.

In his latter years, Hua sponsored domestic military aviation research and development. In 2012, he donated NT$15 million to National Cheng Kung University, and in 2017 he established the Hua Hsi Chun Aeronautical Engineering Foundation. He died in Taichung, Taiwan on 24 January 2017 at the age of 91.
