= Towaoc, Colorado =

Census-designated place in Montezuma County, CO, USA

Towaoc, Colorado Togwayak(a) (Ute-Southern Paiute)
- Census-designated place
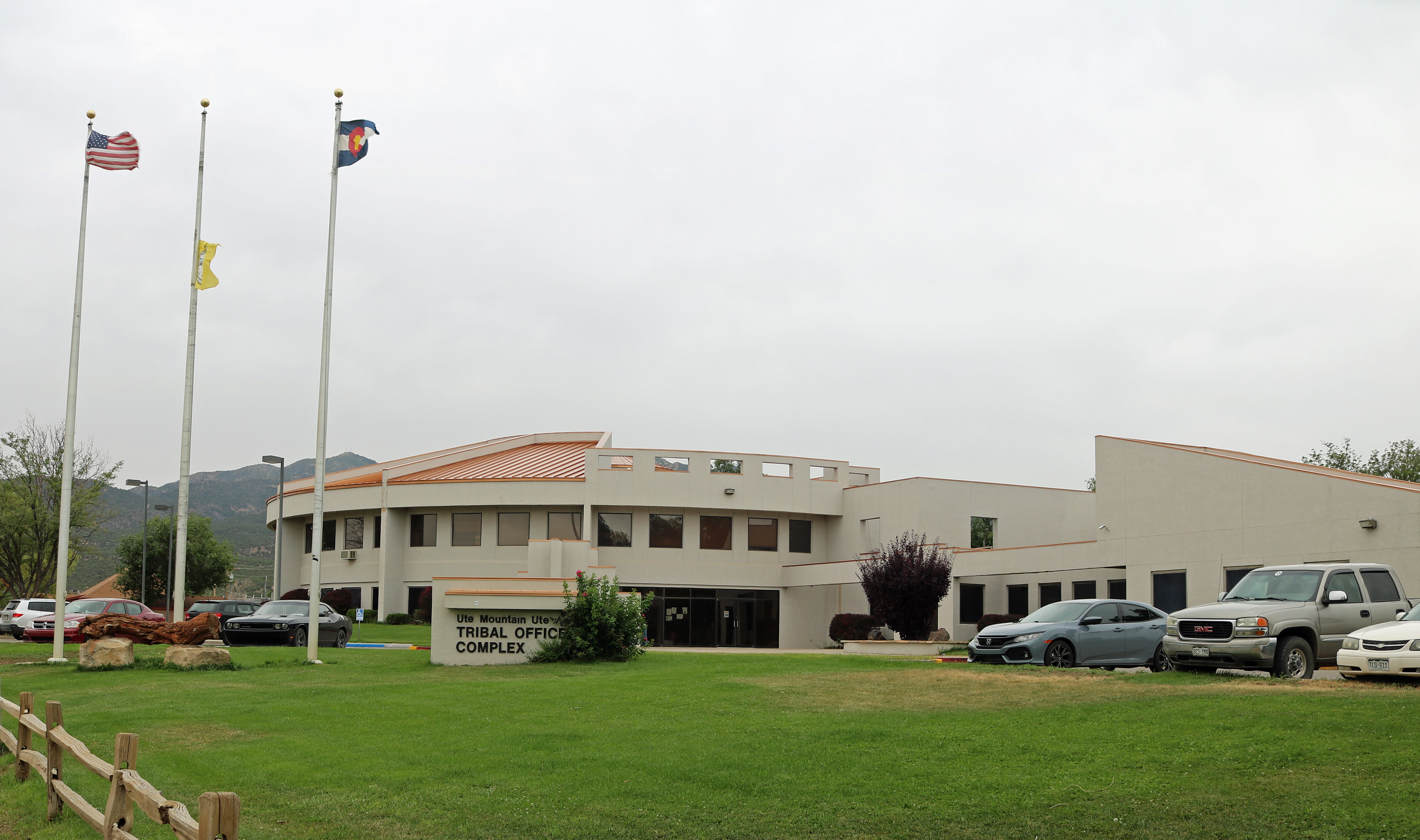
- The Ute Mountain Ute Tribal Office Complex in Towaoc.

- Location of the Towaoc CDP in Montezuma County, Colorado
- Coordinates: 37°12′45″N 108°43′35″W
- Country: United States
- State: Colorado
- County: Montezuma County

Government
  - Type: unincorporated community
  - Body: Montezuma County

Area
  - Total: 3.585 sq mi (9.284 km^{2})
  - Land: 3.585 sq mi (9.284 km^{2})
  - Water: 0 sq mi (0.000 km^{2})
- Elevation: 5,912 ft (1,802 m)

Population (2020)
  - Total: 1,120
  - Density: 312/sq mi (121/km^{2})
- Time zone: UTC−07:00 (MST)
  - Summer (DST): UTC−06:00 (MDT)
- ZIP Code: 81334
- Area code: 970
- GNIS CDP ID: 2409343
- FIPS code: 08-78280

Towaoc (pronounced /tɔɪɔːk/, Ute-Southern Paiute: Togwayak(a)) is a census-designated place (CDP), a post office, and the capital of the Ute Mountain Ute Tribe located on the Ute Mountain Reservation in Montezuma County, Colorado, United States. The Towaoc post office has the ZIP Code 81334 (post office boxes). At the United States Census 2020, the population of the Towaoc CDP was 1,120.

== History ==
The word towaoc (Togwayak(a)) means "thank you" in the Ute language.

The Towaoc, Colorado, post office opened on April 1, 1915. The Ute Mountain Reservation was created on June 6, 1940.

Old Towaoc, located at the base of Ute Mountain, is approximately 2 miles (3 km) west of US Highways 491-160, and includes various tribal and BIA governmental buildings and housing areas, including the tribal offices of the Ute Mountain Ute Tribe. In recent years, a small complex has been developed directly on US Highway 491–160 at the junction of the road into the original town.

== Geography ==
Towaoc is located east of Sleeping Ute Mountain, a sacred mountain of the Ute people, and northeast of the Four Corners Monument.

At the 2020 United States census, the Towaoc CDP had an area of 2,294 acres (9.284 km^{2}), all land.

== Education ==
Towaoc is served by Montezuma-Cortez School District RE-1. The district's comprehensive high school is Montezuma-Cortez High School.

== Demographics ==
Towaoc CDP, Colorado
Year	Pop.	±%
1990	700	—
2000	1,097	+56.7%
2010	1,087	−0.9%
2020	1,120	+3.0%
Source: United States Census Bureau

The United States Census Bureau initially defined the Towaoc CDP for the 1990 United States census.

=== 2020 census ===
As of the 2020 census, Towaoc had a population of 1,120. The median age was 28.3 years. 34.4% of residents were under the age of 18 and 5.6% of residents were 65 years of age or older. For every 100 females there were 78.3 males, and for every 100 females age 18 and over there were 77.5 males age 18 and over.

0.0% of residents lived in urban areas, while 100.0% lived in rural areas.

There were 347 households in Towaoc, of which 41.5% had children under the age of 18 living in them. Of all households, 19.6% were married-couple households, 21.0% were households with a male householder and no spouse or partner present, and 52.4% were households with a female householder and no spouse or partner present. About 23.9% of all households were made up of individuals and 6.9% had someone living alone who was 65 years of age or older.

There were 371 housing units, of which 6.5% were vacant. The homeowner vacancy rate was 0.0% and the rental vacancy rate was 3.1%.

Racial composition as of the 2020 census
Race	Number	Percent
White	6	0.5%
Black or African American	4	0.4%
American Indian and Alaska Native	1,082	96.6%
Asian	0	0.0%
Native Hawaiian and Other Pacific Islander	2	0.2%
Some other race	4	0.4%
Two or more races	22	2.0%
Hispanic or Latino (of any race)	31	2.8%

=== 2000 census ===
Languages (2000)	Percent
Spoke English at home	47.18%
Spoke Ute dialect at home	45.99%
Spoke Navajo at home	5.31%
Spoke Spanish at home	1.08%
Spoke Cheyenne at home	0.43%

== See also ==
- Weeminuche Band of Utes
- Ute people
