= Arriola, Colorado =

Unincorporated community in Montezuma County, Colorado, United States

- unincorporated community
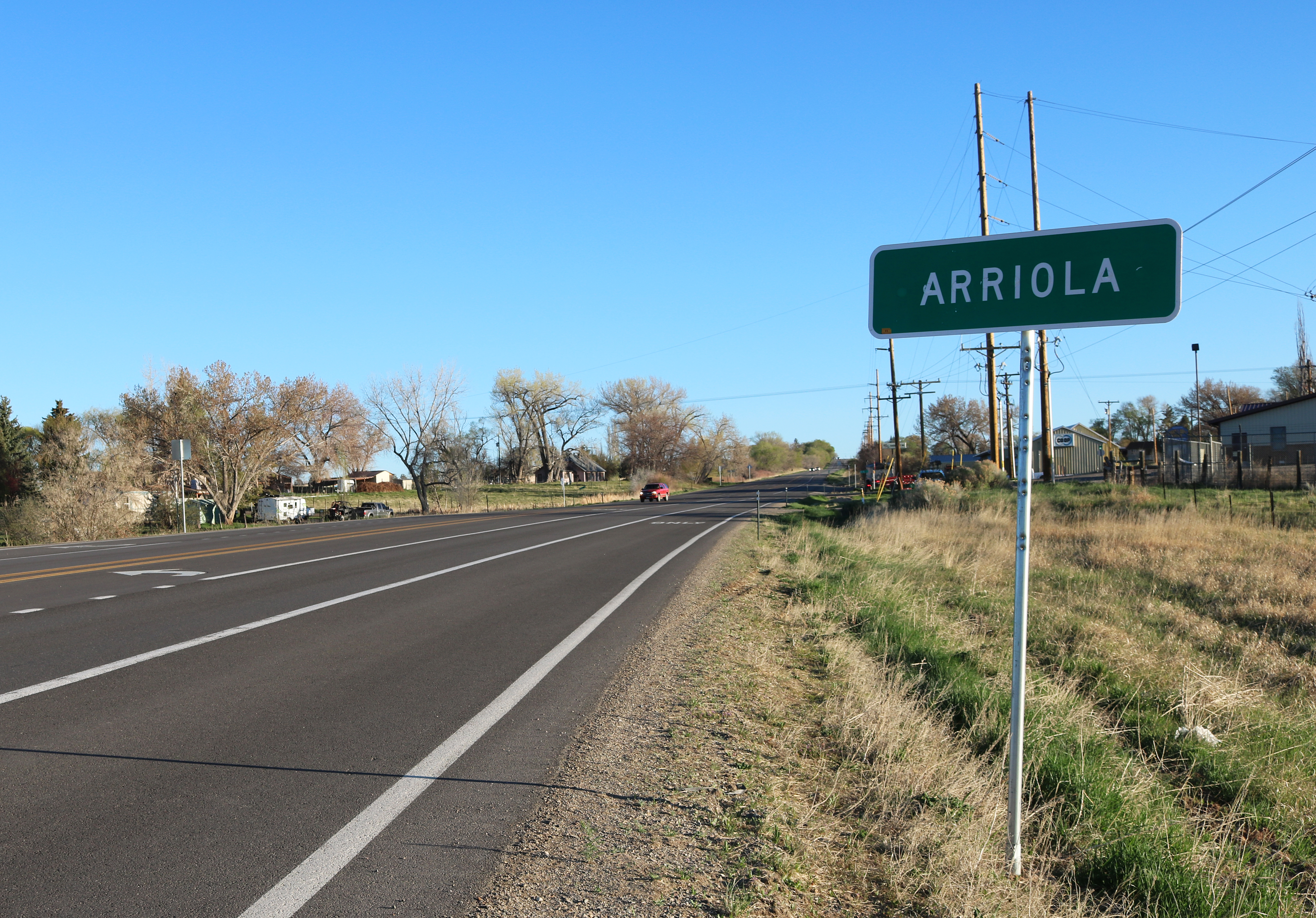
- Arriola and U.S. highway route 491

- Location of Arriola, Colorado. Arriola (Colorado)
- Coordinates: 37°26′33″N 108°38′46″W
- Country: United States
- State: Colorado
- County: Montezuma

Government
  - Type: Unincorporated community
  - Body: Montezuma County
- Elevation: 6,405 ft (1,952 m)
- Time zone: UTC−07:00 (MST)
  - Summer (DST): UTC−06:00 (MDT)
- GNIS pop ID: 178782

Arriola is an unincorporated community in Montezuma County, Colorado.

== History ==
The Arriola, Colorado, post office operated from December 18, 1894, until August 15, 1933. Arriola is believed to honor a Spanish officer.

== Geography ==
Arriola is located along U.S. highway route 491.
