= Montezuma-Cortez High School =

Public high school in Colorado, United States

Coordinates: 37.3421°N 108.5880°W

Location
- 418 South Sligo St. Cortez, Colorado 81321; United States

Information
- Type: Public high school
- School district: Montezuma-Cortez School District RE-1
- CEEB code: 060305
- Principal: Eric Chandler
- Teaching staff: 37.22 (FTE)
- Grades: 9–12
- Enrollment: 601 (2023-2024)
- Student to teacher ratio: 16.15
- Colors: Orange, black, white
- Athletics conference: CHSAA 3A Western Slope
- Mascot: Panther
- Website: www.cortez.k12.co.us/our-schools/mchs

Montezuma-Cortez High School (M-CHS) is a public senior high school in Cortez, Colorado, United States. It is part of the Montezuma-Cortez School District RE-1 and serves students in grades 9 through 12.

The district (of which this is the sole comprehensive high school) includes Cortez, Lewis, and Towaoc.

== History ==
The first high school in Cortez was built in 1909. In 1946, Cortez School (known also as the Calkins School) became a junior high school when Montezuma County High School opened. A new high school campus was constructed on a 14-acre site in 1967, and the former building became the middle school. The Calkins School, an earlier structure, was repurposed for administrative use. In December 2013, construction began on a new $33.9 million high school building, completed in 2015 on a 35-acre site with funding from state and local sources.

== Athletics ==
MCHS competes in the Colorado High School Activities Association (CHSAA), primarily in the 3A classification. Sports offered include basketball, football, soccer, baseball, volleyball, and track & field. In football and soccer, MCHS competes in the 3A Western Slope Conference.

=== State championships ===
The school has won three CHSAA-sanctioned state championships.

Season	Sport	Titles	Classification / year
Winter	Boys' basketball	2	4A (2002), 2A (1962)
Spring	Girls' track and field	1	4A (1992)

== Notable alumni ==
- Larry Brunson -former National Football League player
- Scott Tipton - former U.S. congressman

== See also ==
- Education in the United States
