= Montezuma County, Colorado =

County in Colorado, United States

- County
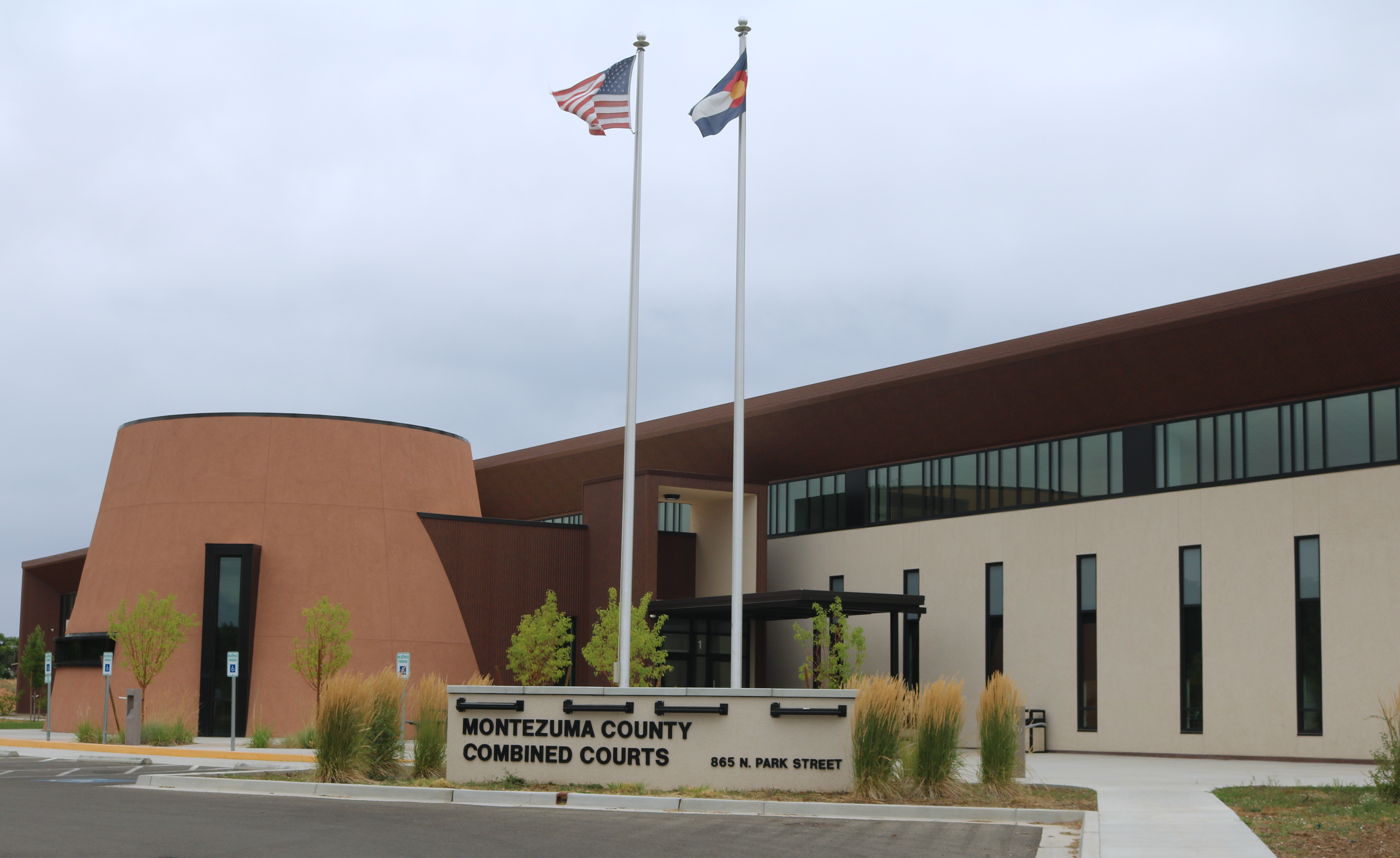
- The Montezuma County Combined Courts building in Cortez

- Logo

- Location within the U.S. state of Colorado
- Coordinates: 37.34°N 108.60°W
- Country: United States
- State: Colorado
- Founded: April 16, 1889
- Named for: Moctezuma II
- Seat: Cortez
- Largest city: Cortez

Area
  - Total: 2,040 sq mi (5,300 km^{2})
  - Land: 2,030 sq mi (5,300 km^{2})
  - Water: 11 sq mi (28 km^{2}) 0.5%

Population (2020)
  - Total: 25,849
  - Estimate (2025): 26,678 ▲
  - Density: 12.7/sq mi (4.92/km^{2})
- Time zone: UTC−7 (Mountain)
  - Summer (DST): UTC−6 (MDT)
- Congressional district: 3rd
- Website: montezumacounty.gov

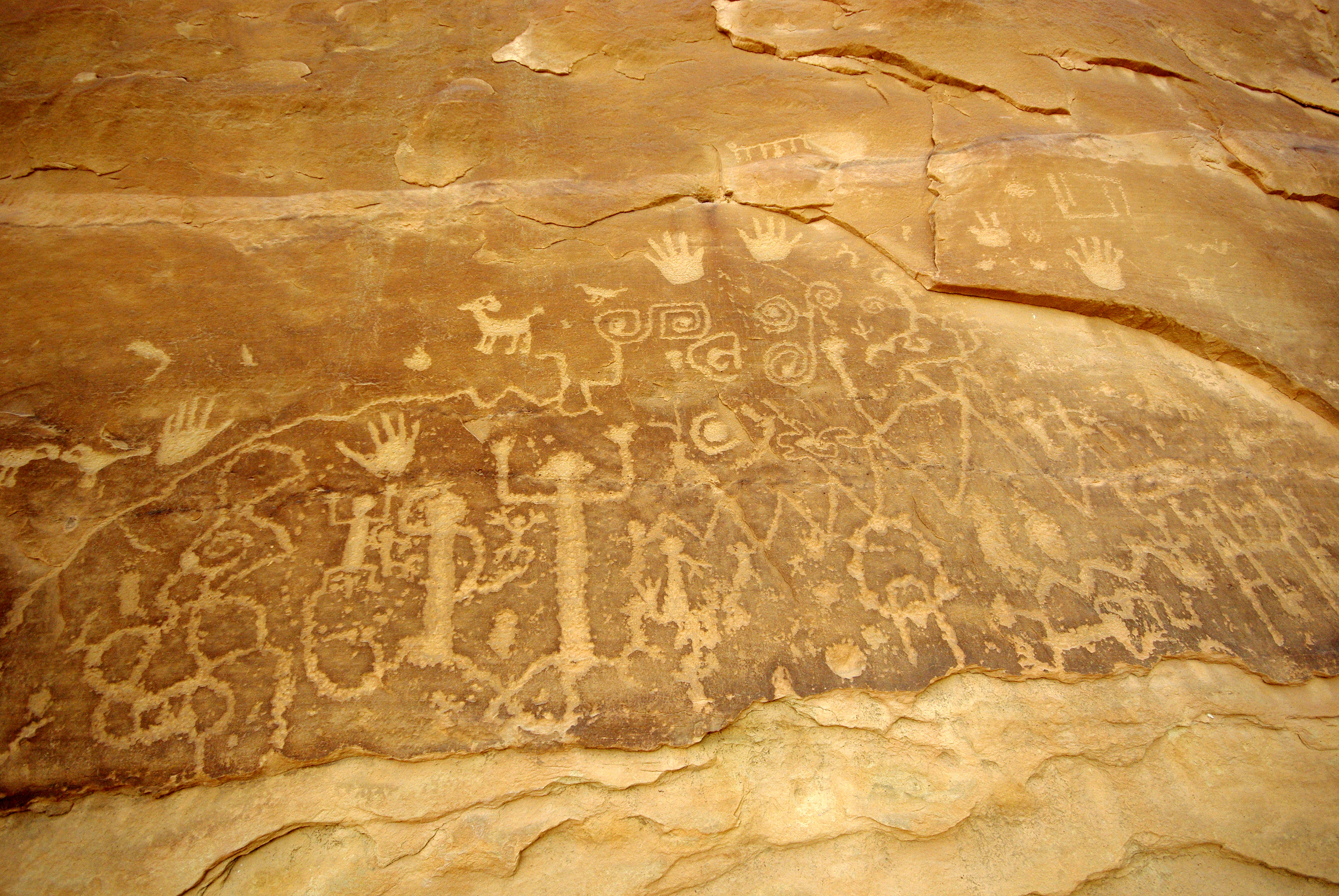
Prehistoric petroglyphs in Mesa Verde National Park

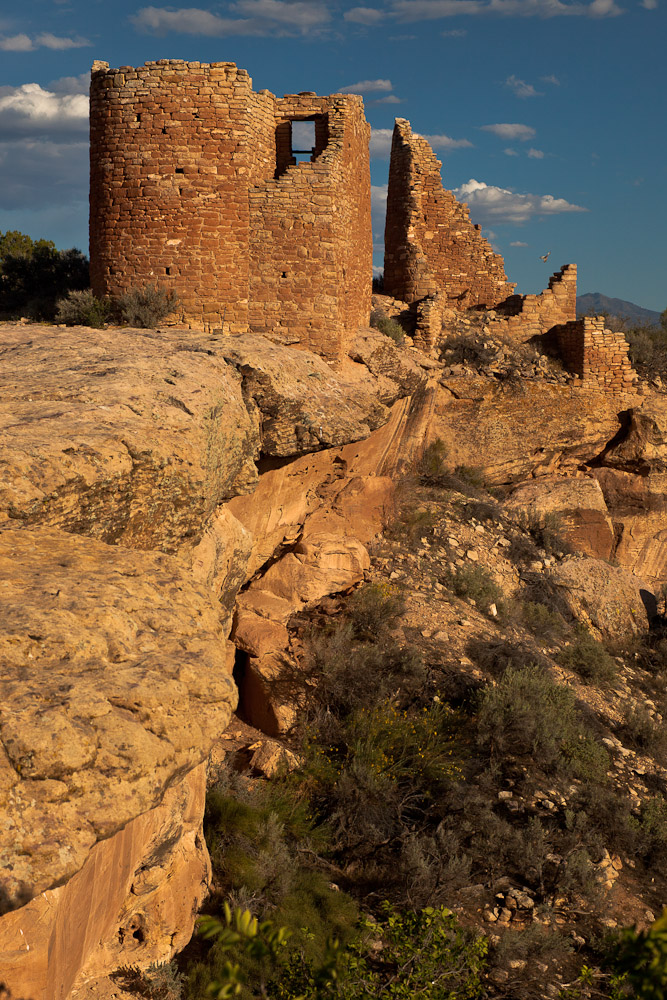
Castle, Hovenweep National Monument

Montezuma County is a county located in the southwest corner of the U.S. state of Colorado. As of the 2020 census, the population was 25,849. The county seat is Cortez. Montezuma County contains many archaeologically significant Amerindian structures, which notably can be found in Mesa Verde National Park, Canyons of the Ancients National Monument, Yucca House National Monument, and Hovenweep National Monument. Montezuma County is also home to most of the Ute Mountain Indian Reservation, home of the Weeminuche Band of the Ute Nation, known as the Ute Mountain Ute Tribe, with its headquarters at Towaoc.

== History ==
Montezuma County has been settled since approximately AD 600, and had an estimated population of approximately 100,000, four times its current population, in the 12th century. However, a series of events caused virtually all permanent settlements to be abandoned between 1200 and 1300, and the area was contested between nomadic Ute and Navajo bands until resettlement occurred in the 1870s. Montezuma County was created out of the western portion of La Plata County by the Colorado Legislature in April 1889. It was named in honor of Moctezuma II, who reigned as emperor of the Aztec Empire in Mexico during its decline at the hands of the Spanish invasion. The building ruins in Mesa Verde National Park were thought to be of Aztec origin at the time.

== Geography ==
According to the U.S. Census Bureau, the county has a total area of 2,040 square miles (5,300 km^{2}), of which 2,030 square miles (5,300 km^{2}) is land and 11 square miles (28 km^{2}) (0.5%) is water.

A large county, roughly 1/3 of its area is tribal land, 1/3 federal land (administered by the National Park Service, the United States Forest Service and the Bureau of Land Management), and 1/3 private or state/county land. It is also varied topographically, ranging in elevation from about 6,000 feet (1,800 m) to more than 13,200 feet (4,000 m), and from high Colorado Plateau desert to alpine tundra. The county has the second largest reservoir in Colorado, McPhee Reservoir, many other large reservoirs, and hundreds of private lakes and ponds. Much of the county is irrigated cropland, and it produces fruit, large numbers of cattle and sheep, and beans. It is served by U.S. Highways 160 and 491 (formerly US 666), and by Cortez Municipal Airport. It has no rail service, although both Mancos and Dolores were established as railroad towns in the 1890s.

=== Adjacent counties ===
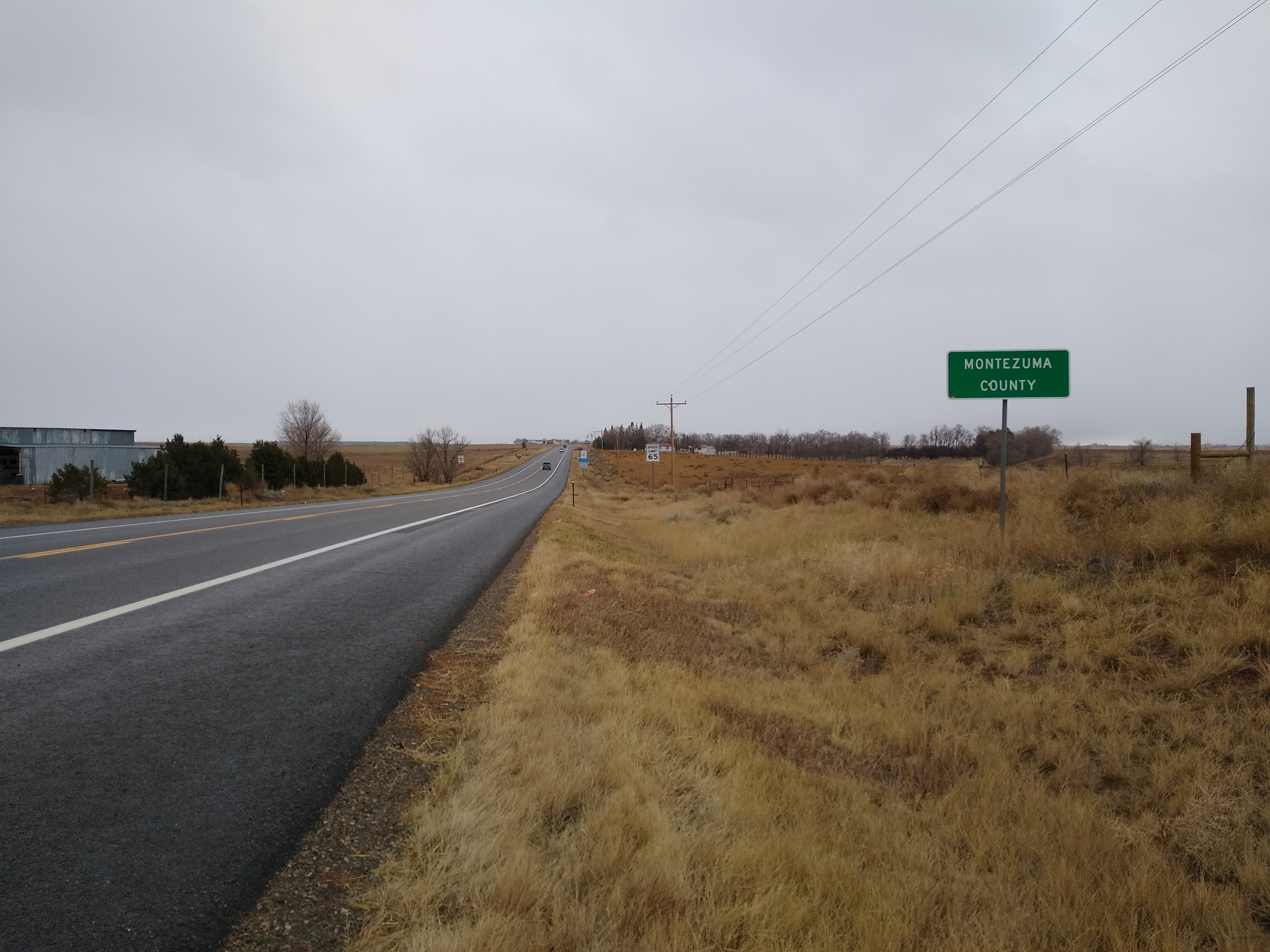
Sign on U.S. Route 491 marking the border with Dolores County

- Dolores County – north
- San Juan County – northeast
- La Plata County – east
- San Juan County, New Mexico – south – New Mexico portion of Four Corners.
- Apache County, Arizona – southwest – Arizona portion of Four Corners.
- San Juan County, Utah – west – Utah portion of Four Corners.

Montezuma County is the only county in the United States to border three counties with the same name in three different states (San Juan County in Colorado, New Mexico, and Utah). The "border" with San Juan County, Colorado, is, however, only a point of zero length.

=== Major highways ===
- U.S. Highway 160
- U.S. Highway 491 (former US 666)
- State Highway 41
- State Highway 145
- State Highway 184

=== National protected areas ===
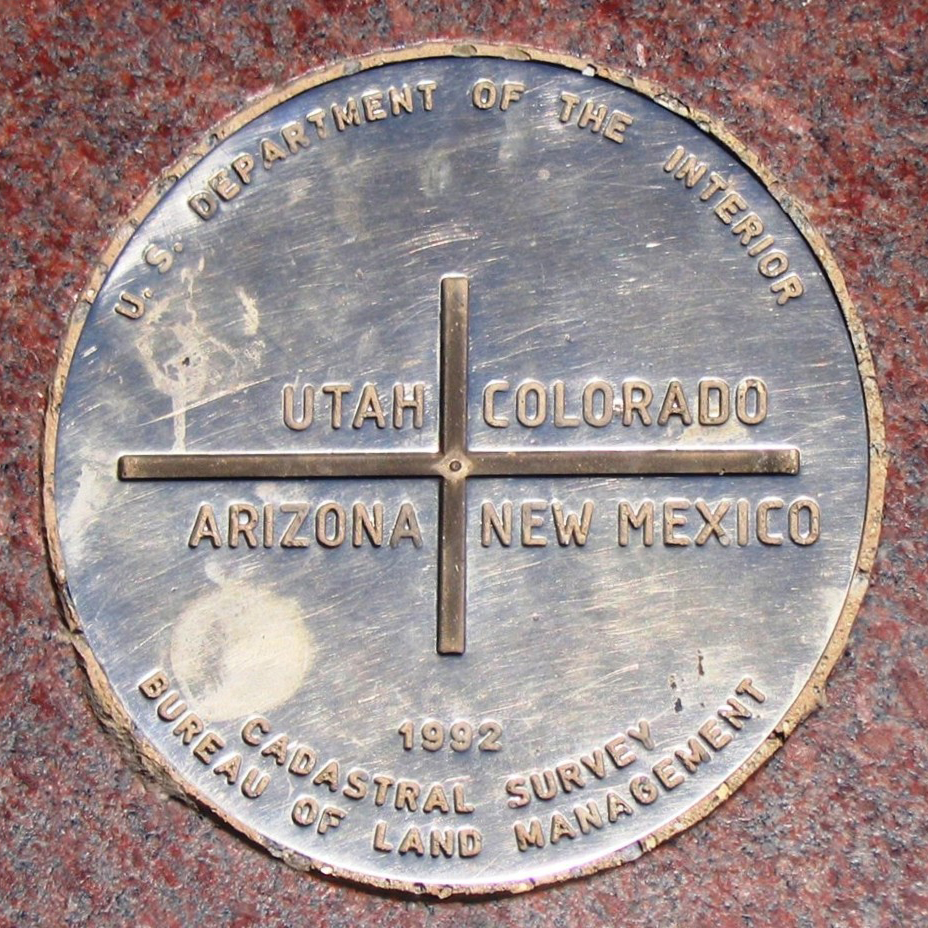
Montezuma County includes the Colorado section of the Four Corners Monument.

- Calico National Recreation Trail
- Canyons of the Ancients National Monument (part)
- Highline Loop National Recreation Trail
- Hovenweep National Monument (part)
- Lowry Ruin National Historic Landmark, now part of Canyons of the Ancients National Monument
- Mesa Verde National Park
- Mesa Verde Wilderness
- Old Spanish National Historic Trail
- Petroglyph Point National Recreation Trail
- San Juan National Forest
- Yucca House National Monument

=== State protected area ===
- Mancos State Park

=== Other protected area ===
- McPhee Reservoir

=== Trails and byways ===
- Great Parks Bicycle Route
- San Juan Skyway
- Trail of the Ancients
- Western Express Bicycle Route

== Demographics ==
Historical population
Census	Pop.	Note	%±
1890	1,529		—
1900	3,058		100.0%
1910	5,029		64.5%
1920	6,260		24.5%
1930	7,798		24.6%
1940	10,463		34.2%
1950	9,991		−4.5%
1960	14,024		40.4%
1970	12,952		−7.6%
1980	16,510		27.5%
1990	18,762		13.6%
2000	23,830		27.0%
2010	25,535		7.2%
2020	25,849		1.2%
2025 (est.)	26,678	▲	3.2%
U.S. Decennial Census; 1790-1960 1900-1990; 1990-2000 2010-2020

=== 2020 census ===
As of the 2020 census, the county had a population of 25,849. Of the residents, 20.8% were under the age of 18 and 23.7% were 65 years of age or older; the median age was 45.3 years. For every 100 females there were 97.4 males, and for every 100 females age 18 and over there were 95.9 males. 33.4% of residents lived in urban areas and 66.6% lived in rural areas.

Montezuma County, Colorado – Racial and ethnic composition Note: the US Census treats Hispanic/Latino as an ethnic category. This table excludes Latinos from the racial categories and assigns them to a separate category. Hispanics/Latinos may be of any race.
Race / Ethnicity (NH = Non-Hispanic)	Pop 2000	Pop 2010	Pop 2020	% 2000	% 2010	% 2020
White alone (NH)	18,476	19,168	18,035	77.53%	75.07%	69.77%
Black or African American alone (NH)	31	47	72	0.13%	0.18%	0.28%
Native American or Alaska Native alone (NH)	2,573	2,923	3,166	10.80%	11.45%	12.25%
Asian alone (NH)	47	118	128	0.20%	0.46%	0.50%
Pacific Islander alone (NH)	13	12	24	0.05%	0.05%	0.09%
Other race alone (NH)	38	20	107	0.16%	0.08%	0.41%
Mixed race or Multiracial (NH)	389	429	1,208	1.63%	1.68%	4.67%
Hispanic or Latino (any race)	2,263	2,818	3,109	9.50%	11.04%	12.03%
Total	23,830	25,535	25,849	100.00%	100.00%	100.00%

The racial makeup of the county was 73.3% White, 0.3% Black or African American, 12.9% American Indian and Alaska Native, 0.6% Asian, 0.1% Native Hawaiian and Pacific Islander, 4.2% from some other race, and 8.5% from two or more races. Hispanic or Latino residents of any race comprised 12.0% of the population.

There were 10,806 households in the county, of which 26.1% had children under the age of 18 living with them and 26.5% had a female householder with no spouse or partner present. About 29.3% of all households were made up of individuals and 14.5% had someone living alone who was 65 years of age or older.

There were 12,295 housing units, of which 12.1% were vacant. Among occupied housing units, 72.0% were owner-occupied and 28.0% were renter-occupied. The homeowner vacancy rate was 1.7% and the rental vacancy rate was 5.7%.

=== 2000 census ===
As of the 2000 census, there were 23,830 people, 9,201 households, and 6,514 families residing in the county. The population density was 12 people per square mile (4.6 people/km^{2}). There were 10,497 housing units at an average density of 5 units per square mile (1.9 units/km^{2}). The racial makeup of the county was 81.72% White, 0.14% Black or African American, 11.23% Native American, 0.20% Asian, 0.06% Pacific Islander, 4.26% from other races, and 2.38% from two or more races. 9.50% of the population were Hispanic or Latino of any race.

There were 9,201 households, out of which 33.30% had children under the age of 18 living with them, 56.40% were married couples living together, 10.60% had a female householder with no husband present, and 29.20% were non-families. 24.60% of all households were made up of individuals, and 9.30% had someone living alone who was 65 years of age or older. The average household size was 2.54 and the average family size was 3.04.

In the county, the population was spread out, with 27.50% under the age of 18, 7.10% from 18 to 24, 26.30% from 25 to 44, 25.30% from 45 to 64, and 13.80% who were 65 years of age or older. The median age was 38 years. For every 100 females there were 96.70 males. For every 100 females age 18 and over, there were 92.20 males.

The median income for a household in the county was $32,083, and the median income for a family was $38,071. Males had a median income of $30,666 versus $21,181 for females. The per capita income for the county was $17,003. About 13.10% of families and 16.40% of the population were below the poverty line, including 23.20% of those under age 18 and 14.40% of those age 65 or over.

== Communities ==
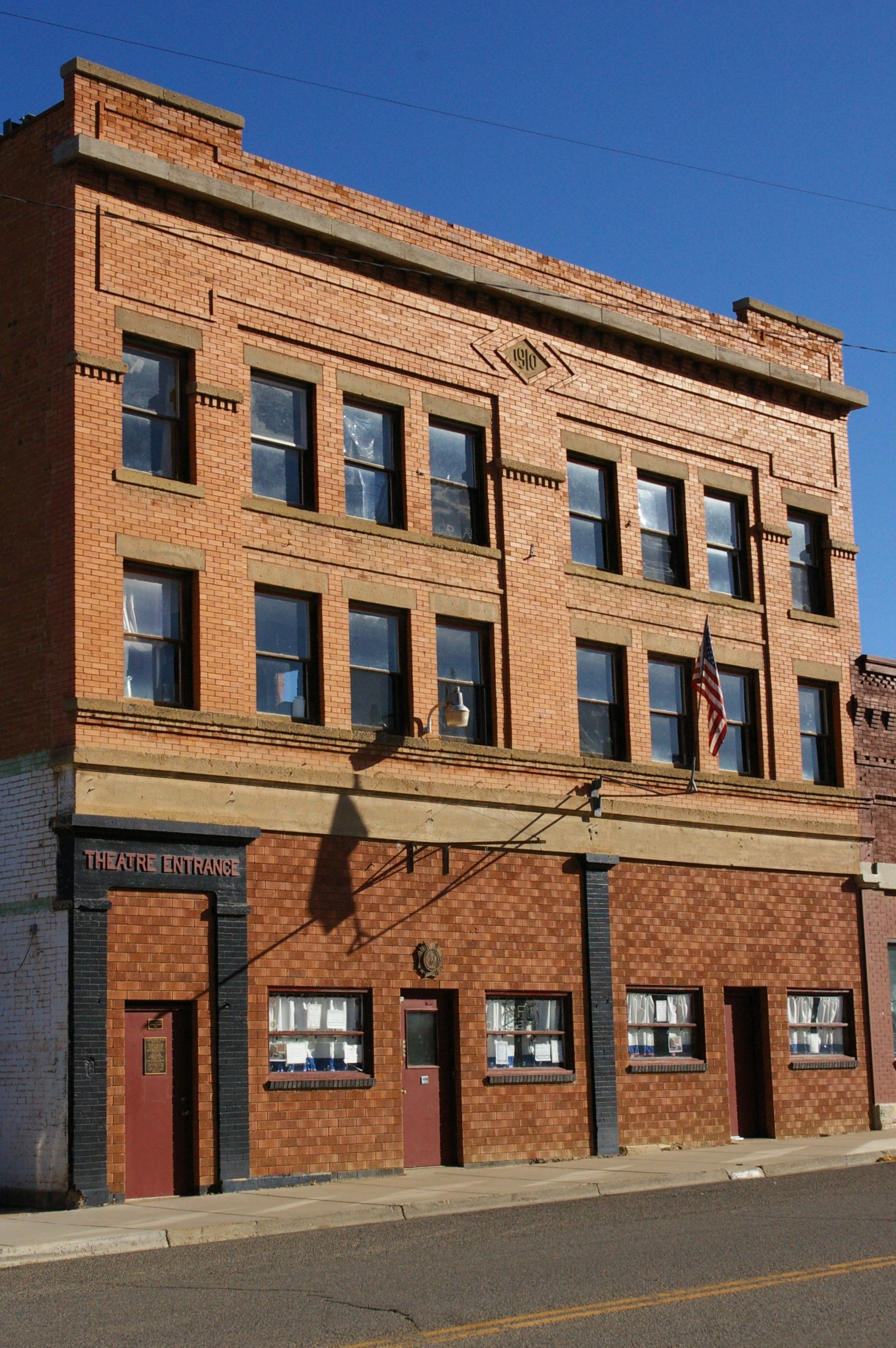
Mancos, Colorado Opera House 2009

=== City ===
- Cortez

=== Towns ===
- Dolores
- Mancos

=== Census-designated places ===
- Lewis
- Towaoc

=== Other unincorporated places ===
- Arriola
- Pleasant View
- Yellow Jacket

== Politics ==
In its early history Montezuma County favored the Democratic Party. It was one of the few counties in the West to be won by Alton B. Parker in 1904, and along with neighboring La Plata County was one of only two Colorado counties to give a plurality to John W. Davis in the three-way 1924 election. However, since the 1940s Montezuma has been a strongly Republican county: no Democrat since 1968 has won over forty percent of the county's vote in a Presidential election.

United States presidential election results for Montezuma County, Colorado
Year	Republican		Democratic		Third party(ies)	
Year	No.	%	No.	%	No.	%
1892	140	27.83%	0	0.00%	363	72.17%
1896	33	3.75%	845	96.13%	1	0.11%
1900	220	22.68%	732	75.46%	18	1.86%
1904	526	45.66%	563	48.87%	63	5.47%
1908	440	29.41%	948	63.37%	108	7.22%
1912	285	15.89%	1,017	56.69%	492	27.42%
1916	425	21.60%	1,458	74.09%	85	4.32%
1920	936	52.20%	727	40.55%	130	7.25%
1924	703	34.58%	721	35.46%	609	29.96%
1928	1,341	62.37%	772	35.91%	37	1.72%
1932	887	31.84%	1,779	63.85%	120	4.31%
1936	1,087	38.89%	1,579	56.49%	129	4.62%
1940	2,313	59.25%	1,573	40.29%	18	0.46%
1944	1,610	56.99%	1,207	42.73%	8	0.28%
1948	1,630	49.20%	1,653	49.89%	30	0.91%
1952	2,466	68.01%	1,127	31.08%	33	0.91%
1956	2,492	63.59%	1,402	35.77%	25	0.64%
1960	2,778	56.69%	2,115	43.16%	7	0.14%
1964	2,035	42.95%	2,686	56.69%	17	0.36%
1968	2,461	56.42%	1,349	30.93%	552	12.65%
1972	3,391	73.49%	1,223	26.51%	0	0.00%
1976	3,002	57.99%	1,993	38.50%	182	3.52%
1980	4,120	68.60%	1,467	24.43%	419	6.98%
1984	4,753	73.06%	1,665	25.59%	88	1.35%
1988	4,208	64.23%	2,233	34.09%	110	1.68%
1992	3,124	40.90%	2,270	29.72%	2,244	29.38%
1996	4,175	53.31%	2,578	32.92%	1,078	13.77%
2000	6,158	65.62%	2,556	27.24%	670	7.14%
2004	6,988	63.44%	3,867	35.11%	160	1.45%
2008	6,961	58.87%	4,661	39.42%	203	1.72%
2012	7,401	60.08%	4,542	36.87%	375	3.04%
2016	7,853	61.07%	3,973	30.90%	1,032	8.03%
2020	9,306	60.04%	5,836	37.65%	358	2.31%
2024	8,972	59.26%	5,793	38.27%	374	2.47%

United States Senate election results for Montezuma County, Colorado2
Year	Republican		Democratic		Third party(ies)	
Year	No.	%	No.	%	No.	%
2020	9,273	61.03%	5,538	36.45%	383	2.52%

United States Senate election results for Montezuma County, Colorado3
Year	Republican		Democratic		Third party(ies)	
Year	No.	%	No.	%	No.	%
2022	6,960	55.64%	5,072	40.55%	477	3.81%

Colorado Gubernatorial election results for Montezuma County
Year	Republican		Democratic		Third party(ies)	
Year	No.	%	No.	%	No.	%
2022	6,772	54.09%	5,187	41.43%	561	4.48%

In gubernatorial elections, Montezuma County is also Republican-leaning: in 2010 it was along with neighboring Dolores County one of only two counties to give a plurality to Dan Maes. The last Democratic gubernatorial nominee to win Montezuma County was Roy Romer in 1990 when he carried all but four counties statewide. The last Democratic senatorial candidate to carry Montezuma County was Ben Nighthorse Campbell – later to switch to the Republican Party – in 1992.

Montezuma County is split between two house districts for the Colorado House of Representatives, House District 58 & House District 59. Prior to the redistricting, which took effect in the November 2022 election, Montezuma County was solely in House District 58.

== Education ==
The county has three school districts: Montezuma-Cortez School District RE-1, Dolores School District RE-4A, and Mancos School District RE-6.

== See also ==
- Bibliography of Colorado
- Geography of Colorado
- History of Colorado
  - East Canyon Fire
  - William B. Ebbert, represented Montezuma in the Colorado General Assembly in early 20th century.
  - National Register of Historic Places listings in Montezuma County, Colorado
- Index of Colorado-related articles
- List of Colorado-related lists
  - List of counties in Colorado
- Outline of Colorado
