= Cortez, Colorado =

City in Colorado, United States

- Home rule municipality
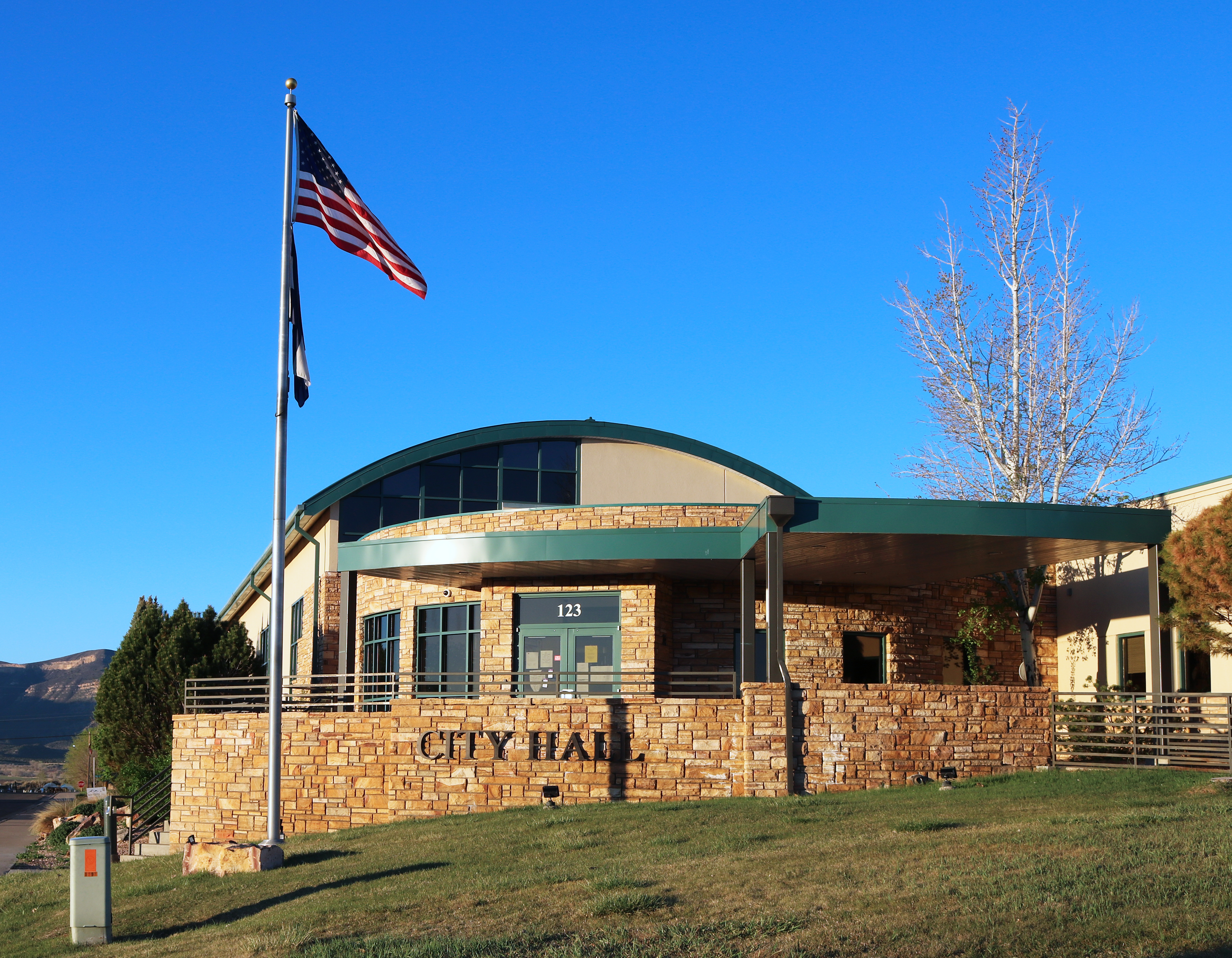
- Cortez city hall, built in 2017.

- Logo

- Location of the City of Cortez in Montezuma County, Colorado
- Coordinates: 37°21′50″N 108°33′45″W
- Country: United States
- State: Colorado
- County: Montezuma County seat

Government
  - Type: Home rule municipality
  - Mayor: Rachel Medina

Area
  - Total: 6.274 sq mi (16.249 km^{2})
  - Land: 6.230 sq mi (16.136 km^{2})
  - Water: 0.044 sq mi (0.113 km^{2})
- Elevation: 6,181 ft (1,884 m)

Population (2020)
  - Total: 8,766
  - Density: 1,407/sq mi (543/km^{2})
- Time zone: UTC−07:00 (MST)
  - Summer (DST): UTC−06:00 (MDT)
- ZIP Code: 81321
- Area code: 970
- FIPS code: 08-17375
- GNIS feature ID: 2410236
- Website: cortezco.gov

Cortez is a home-rule municipality that is the county seat of and the most populous municipality in Montezuma County, Colorado, United States. The city's population was 8,766 at the 2020 United States census.

== History ==
In 1886, the town was built to provide housing for the men working on the tunnels and irrigation ditches required to divert water out of the Dolores River and into Montezuma Valley. The town was named for Spanish conquistador Hernán Cortés. The Cortez, Colorado post office opened on June 21, 1887.

=== Prehistoric sites ===
Many prehistoric sites in the Cortez area are listed on the Colorado State Register of Historic Properties or both the state register and the National Register of Historic Places. They include large parks or centers, such as Crow Canyon Archaeological Center, Canyon of the Ancients National Monument, Hovenweep National Monument, and Mesa Verde National Park. Also, smaller or individuals sites, such as Cowboy Wash, Hawkins Pueblo and cliff dwellings, Lowry Ruin, Mitchell Springs Archeological Site, also known as the Mitchell Springs Ruin Group, Mud Springs Pueblo, and Yucca House National Monument. Within the McElmo Drainage Unit (AD 1075–1300) is Cannonball Ruins, Maxwell Community, Roy's Ruin, Sand Canyon Archaeological District, and Wallace Ruin are found there.

=== Historic trails or byways ===
Trails or byways through the Cortez area include:

- Old Spanish National Historic Trail
- San Juan Skyway National Scenic Byway
- Trail of the Ancients

=== 1959 U-2 emergency landing ===
A Lockheed U-2 reconnaissance aircraft made an emergency nighttime forced landing August 3, 1959, at the Cortez Municipal Airport. Republic of China Air Force Major Hsi-Chun Mike Hua was on a training flight originating at Laughlin AFB, Texas; the U-2 aircraft engine flamed out at 70,000 feet AMSL. Maj. Hua established best glide and was able to navigate through a valley to a lighted airport that was not on his map, of the existence of which he was unaware until he found it. The airport was the only one in the area with a lighted runway illuminated overnight.

== Geography ==
At the 2020 United States census, the city had a total area of 4,015 acres (16.249 km^{2}) including 28 acres (0.113 km^{2}) covered by water.

=== Climate ===
Cortez has a dry-summer continental climate (Köppen Dsb), though it borders on a semiarid climate (BSk) due to low precipitation. The city has hot summer days and cold winter nights, the latter a result of its elevation.

Climate data for Cortez, Colorado, 1991–2020 normals, extremes 1911–present
Month	Jan	Feb	Mar	Apr	May	Jun	Jul	Aug	Sep	Oct	Nov	Dec	Year
Record high °F (°C)	63 (17)	79 (26)	82 (28)	88 (31)	95 (35)	102 (39)	102 (39)	102 (39)	99 (37)	90 (32)	75 (24)	67 (19)	102 (39)
Mean maximum °F (°C)	54.3 (12.4)	59.8 (15.4)	69.8 (21.0)	77.4 (25.2)	86.3 (30.2)	94.2 (34.6)	98.0 (36.7)	94.6 (34.8)	90.0 (32.2)	80.5 (26.9)	67.6 (19.8)	56.6 (13.7)	98.3 (36.8)
Mean daily maximum °F (°C)	42.9 (6.1)	47.2 (8.4)	56.0 (13.3)	63.5 (17.5)	73.4 (23.0)	85.3 (29.6)	90.5 (32.5)	87.7 (30.9)	80.1 (26.7)	67.4 (19.7)	54.1 (12.3)	43.2 (6.2)	65.9 (18.8)
Daily mean °F (°C)	29.7 (−1.3)	34.4 (1.3)	41.8 (5.4)	48.2 (9.0)	57.3 (14.1)	67.3 (19.6)	73.8 (23.2)	71.7 (22.1)	63.8 (17.7)	51.5 (10.8)	39.9 (4.4)	30.4 (−0.9)	50.8 (10.5)
Mean daily minimum °F (°C)	16.6 (−8.6)	21.5 (−5.8)	27.6 (−2.4)	32.9 (0.5)	41.3 (5.2)	49.4 (9.7)	57.2 (14.0)	55.8 (13.2)	47.5 (8.6)	35.5 (1.9)	25.8 (−3.4)	17.7 (−7.9)	35.7 (2.1)
Mean minimum °F (°C)	−1.0 (−18.3)	4.0 (−15.6)	13.9 (−10.1)	20.5 (−6.4)	27.9 (−2.3)	37.3 (2.9)	47.6 (8.7)	47.2 (8.4)	34.1 (1.2)	21.3 (−5.9)	10.5 (−11.9)	0.3 (−17.6)	−4.3 (−20.2)
Record low °F (°C)	−27 (−33)	−31 (−35)	−7 (−22)	6 (−14)	15 (−9)	27 (−3)	31 (−1)	30 (−1)	23 (−5)	7 (−14)	−14 (−26)	−22 (−30)	−31 (−35)
Average precipitation inches (mm)	1.06 (27)	0.96 (24)	0.86 (22)	0.72 (18)	0.93 (24)	0.37 (9.4)	1.25 (32)	1.34 (34)	1.48 (38)	1.08 (27)	0.85 (22)	0.89 (23)	11.79 (300.4)
Average snowfall inches (cm)	8.0 (20)	7.2 (18)	5.0 (13)	2.2 (5.6)	0.3 (0.76)	0.0 (0.0)	0.0 (0.0)	0.0 (0.0)	0.0 (0.0)	0.6 (1.5)	2.7 (6.9)	7.4 (19)	33.4 (84.76)
Average extreme snow depth inches (cm)	5.1 (13)	4.1 (10)	1.6 (4.1)	0.7 (1.8)	0.0 (0.0)	0.0 (0.0)	0.0 (0.0)	0.0 (0.0)	0.0 (0.0)	0.3 (0.76)	1.3 (3.3)	3.8 (9.7)	6.6 (17)
Average precipitation days (≥ 0.01 in)	6.7	7.0	6.1	5.4	6.0	2.8	7.4	8.4	6.9	5.5	5.0	7.2	74.4
Average snowy days (≥ 0.1 in)	5.8	4.6	3.6	1.9	0.4	0.0	0.0	0.0	0.0	0.5	1.9	5.1	23.8
Source 1: NOAA
Source 2: National Weather Service

== Demographics ==
Historical population
Census	Pop.	Note	%±
1890	332		—
1900	125		−62.3%
1910	565		352.0%
1920	541		−4.2%
1930	921		70.2%
1940	1,778		93.1%
1950	2,680		50.7%
1960	6,764		152.4%
1970	6,032		−10.8%
1980	7,095		17.6%
1990	7,284		2.7%
2000	7,977		9.5%
2010	8,482		6.3%
2020	8,766		3.3%
U.S. Decennial Census

As of the 2010 census, 8,482 people, 3,590 households, and 2,234 families were residing in the city. The population density was 1,449.9 inhabitants per square mile (559.8/km^{2}). The 3,885 housing units had an average density of 637.6 per square mile (246.2/km^{2}). The gender makeup of the city was 48.1% male (4,083) and 51.9% female (4,399). The racial makeup of the city was 79.2% White, 0.4% African American, 11.8% Native American, 0.8% Asian, 6.04% from other races, and 2.44% from two or more races. Hispanics or Latinos of any race were 13.3% of the population.

Of the 3,590 households, 30.8% had children under 18 living with them, 42.0% were married couples living together, 14.8% had a female householder with no husband present, and 37.8% were not families. About 30.0% of all households were made up of individuals, and 12.7% had someone living alone who was 65 or older. The average household size was 2.33 and the average family size was 2.92.

In the city, the age distribution was 26.7% under 18, 8.8% from 18 to 24, 26.6% from 25 to 44, 21.6% from 45 to 64, and 16.4% who were 65 or older. The median age was 36 years. For every 100 females, there were 91.4 males. For every 100 females age 18 and over, there were 84.4 males.

The median income for a household in the city was $28,776, and for a family was $35,533. Males had a median income of $30,755 versus $20,280 for females. The per capita income for the city was $18,040. About 14.8% of families and 18.6% of the population were below the poverty line, including 27.3% of those under 18 and 17.3% of those 65 or over.

== Economy ==
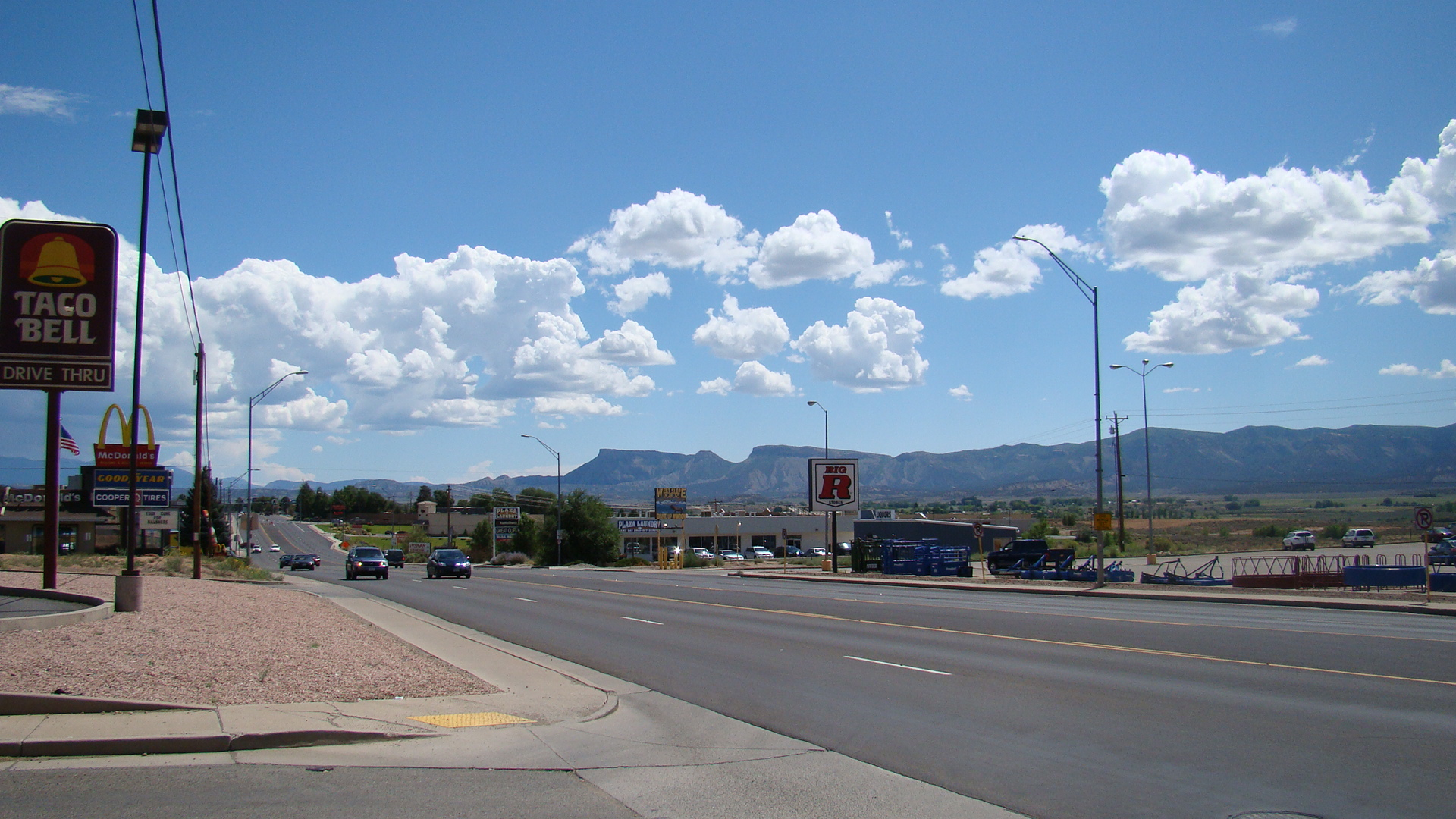
View looking southeast of Main Street in Cortez, with the cliff faces of the Mesa Verde visible in the distance

Cortez is a local commercial center, competing with Durango in the east, and Farmington, New Mexico, in the south, and draws trade from southeastern Utah, the extreme northeastern corner of Arizona, the Shiprock area of northwestern New Mexico, and San Miguel, Dolores, Montezuma, and parts of La Plata County in Colorado. Its economy is based very heavily on tourism, both to nearby Mesa Verde National Park and San Juan National Forest, Bureau of Land Management (BLM) lands in the area (including Canyons of the Ancients National Monument, as well as the Ute Mountain Ute Tribe and Navajo Indian Reservations).

Mesa Verde National Park, featuring Ancestral Pueblo cliff dwellings, is situated southeast of Cortez.

Cortez is home to the headquarters of Osprey Packs, which employs over 100 people in Cortez.

== Education ==
Cortez is within the Montezuma-Cortez School District RE-1. The district has one preschool, five elementary schools, one middle school, and one high school. The educational system is currently suffering a loss of 1.6% according to the Transitional Colorado Assessment Program.

Montezuma-Cortez RE-1 Preschool, Kemper Elementary School, Lewis-Arriola Elementary School, Manaugh Elementary School, Mesa Elementary School, Pleasant View Elementary School, Cortez Middle School, and Montezuma-Cortez High School are located in Cortez. The high school mascot is the Panther.

== Government ==
The city council of Cortez is composed of seven members, including the mayor and mayor pro tempore. The current mayor of Cortez is Rachel Medina and the mayor pro tem is Lydia DeHaven.

== Transportation ==
Cortez Municipal Airport serves Cortez, which is part of Colorado's Bustang network and is on the Durango-Grand Junction Outrider line.

== Notable people ==
- William B. Ebbert, rancher and politician, represented Cortez in the Colorado General Assembly.
- Vince Lee, American architect, climber, and mountaineer
- Michael Milenski, Cortez native who was founder and general director of Long Beach Opera
- Chuck Nevitt, former NBA basketball player
- Scott Tipton, U.S. House of Representatives - Colorado's 3rd District
- Eli Tomac, professional dirt bike racer

== See also ==
- Four Corners
