= San Juan Skyway Scenic and Historic Byway =

Colorado Scenic and Historic Byway

Coordinates: 37.8989°N 107.7119°W

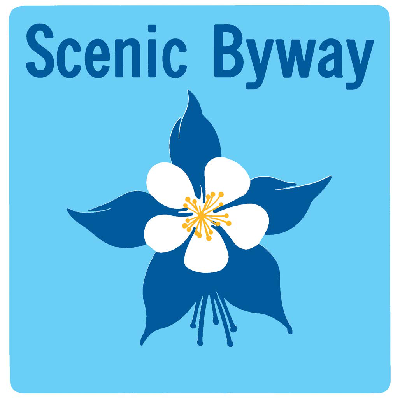
San Juan Skyway Scenic and Historic Byway

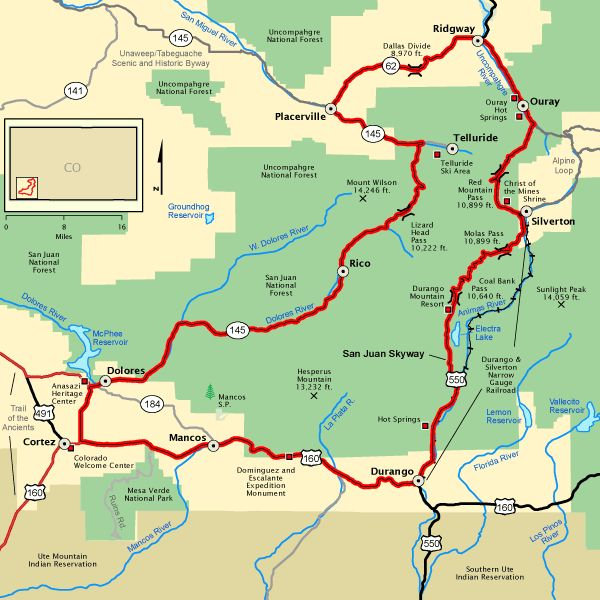

Route information
- Maintained by CDOT
- Length: 236 mi (380 km)
- Existed: September 1988–present

Major junctions
- South end: US 550 / US 160 Durango
- North end: US 550 / SH 62 Ridgway

Location
- Country: United States
- State: Colorado
- Counties: Dolores, La Plata, Montezuma, San Juan, and San Miguel counties

Highway system
- Scenic Byways; National; National Forest; BLM; NPS; Colorado State Highway System; Interstate; US; State; Scenic

The San Juan Skyway Scenic and Historic Byway is a 236-mile (380 km) All-American Road, National Forest Scenic Byway, and Colorado Scenic and Historic Byway located in Dolores, La Plata, Montezuma, San Juan, and San Miguel counties, Colorado, United States. The byway forms a loop in southwestern Colorado traversing the heart of the San Juan Mountains. The San Juan Skyway reaches its zenith at Red Mountain Pass at elevation 11,018 feet (3,358 m). Mesa Verde National Park was one of the original UNESCO World Heritage Sites. The Silverton Historic District and the Telluride Historic District are National Historic Landmarks.

It roughly parallels the routes of the narrow gauge railways: Rio Grande Southern (US 160, SH 145 and SH 62); and the unconnected Ouray and Silverton Branches of the Denver & Rio Grande along US 550 with the Silverton Railroad bridging a part of the gap. Its origin can be traced to the Around the Circle Route promoted by the D&RG.

The San Juan Skyway overlaps with the Trail of the Ancients Scenic and Historic Byway on Colorado State Highway 145 between U.S. Highway 160 and Colorado State Highway 184. The San Juan Skyway connects with the Tracks Across Borders Scenic and Historic Byway at Durango, the Alpine Loop Back Country Byway at Silverton and Ouray, and the Unaweep Tabeguache Scenic Byway at Placerville.

== Route description ==
=== U.S. Highway 160 ===
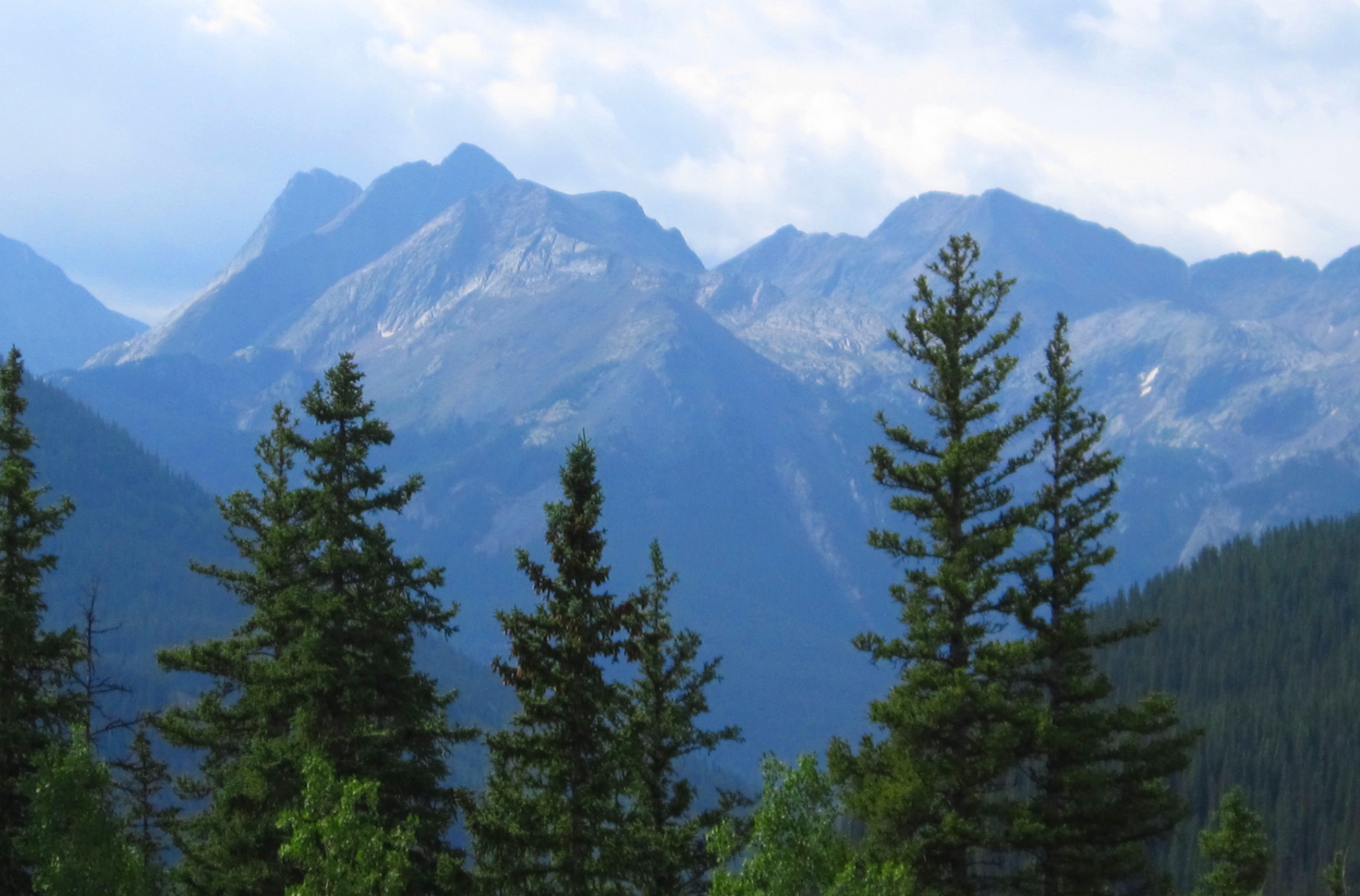
View of San Juan Mountains from the San Juan Skyway

Starting in Durango, Colorado, the largest city on San Juan Skyway, the byway follows U.S. Highway 160 (US 160) west through the town of Mancos to Cortez passing the entrance to Mesa Verde National Park.

=== State Highway 145 ===
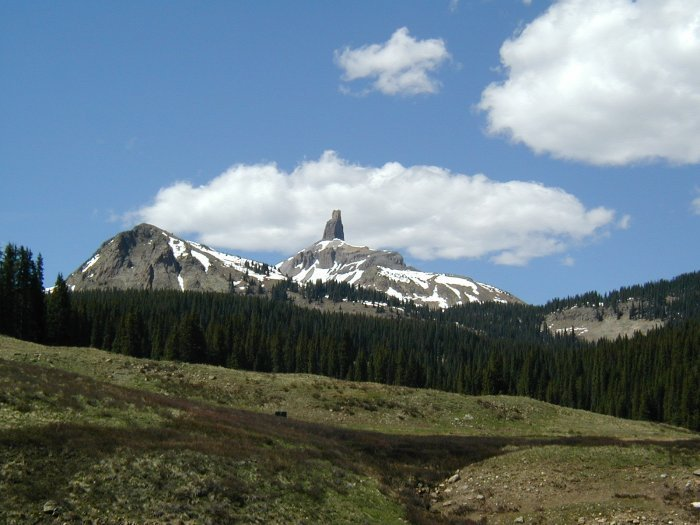
Lizard Head Peak

The byway turns north at Cortez, following State Highway 145 (SH 145) through the town of Dolores and the Dolores River into the San Juan National Forest. The byway passes through Rico, county seat of Dolores County prior to 1941. The old Courthouse still remains. From Rico the byway crosses 10,222 ft (3116 m) Lizard Head Pass and enters the Uncompahgre National Forest. Lizard Head Pass provides views of the 14,159-foot (4,316 m) El Diente Peak, the 14,246-foot (4,342 m) Mount Wilson, the 14,017-foot (4,272 m) Wilson Peak and the pass's namesake, the 13,113-foot (3,997 m) Lizard Head Peak. The byway descends near the town of Ophir past the location of the Ophir Loop of the Rio Grande Southern Railroad. A spur road heads off to the mining town turned ski resort of Telluride. The byway follows the San Miguel River to the town of Placerville.

=== State Highway 62 ===
The byway turns east at Placerville onto SH 62 and follows it over Dallas Divide. There are many excellent views of the San Juan Mountains, especially of the mountains around the 14,150-foot (4,310 m) Mount Sneffels. From the top of the divide the byway descends into the town of Ridgway. The entire route of the byway from Durango to Ridgway roughly follows the route of the Rio Grande Southern Railroad.

=== U.S. Highway 550 ===
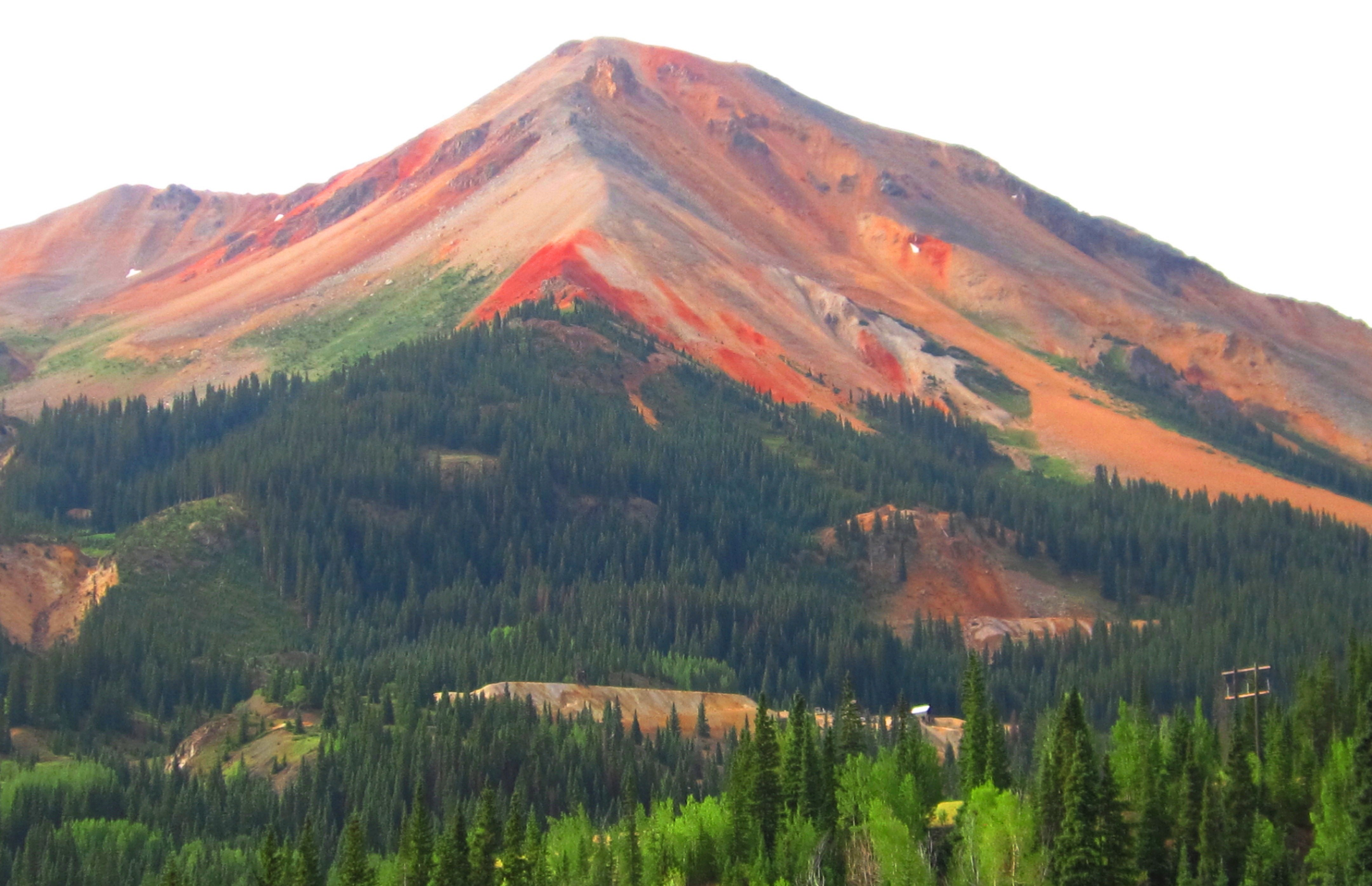
The characteristic red mountains of Red Mountain Pass

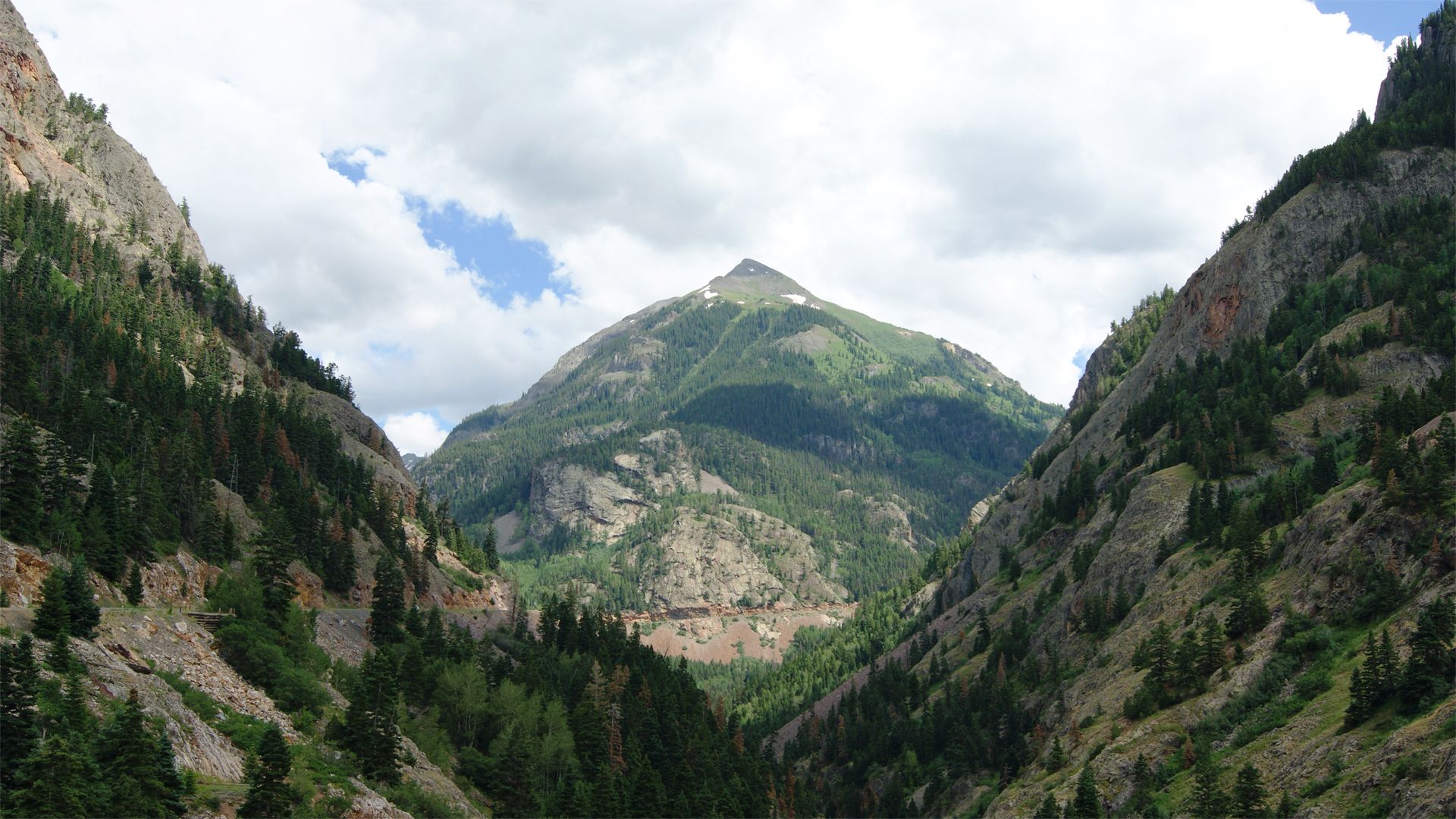
Abrams Mountain above Ouray

From Ridgway, the byway turns south onto US 550 following the Uncompahgre River into the Victorian mining town of Ouray. The highway is referred to as the Million Dollar Highway from Ouray south back to Durango. For the first 7.0 miles (11.3 km) south of Ouray the byway follows through the Uncompahgre Gorge. Just past the only tunnel on the route, just south of Ouray, the road crosses over Bear Creek Falls on a bridge at the location of an impassable toll booth on the original road. The Alpine Loop National Back Country Byway, a four wheel drive jeep road, takes off in the gorge south of Bear Creek Falls. Before leaving the gorge the byway passes through a snow shed under the Riverside Slide avalanche zone. A monument stands near here honoring those who have lost their lives in the avalanche, including several snowplow operators. At this point the byway enters Ironton Park, a nice flat valley in contrast to the gorge. The road ascends several switchbacks, or S-curves, past the Idarado mining operation to the 11,018-foot (3,358 m) summit of Red Mountain Pass, providing views of Red Mountain and several ghost towns. Back into the San Juan National Forest the highway descends through the Chattanooga Valley to Silverton.

From Silverton the byway passes over the 10,910-foot (3,330 m) Molas Pass and the 10,640-foot (3,240 m) Coal Bank Pass, descending past the ski resort of Purgatory Resort. From Hermosa, the road parallels the Durango and Silverton narrow gauge railroad before returning to Durango.

== History ==
The San Juan Skyway was designated as a National Forest Scenic Byway in September 1988. It was later named a Colorado Scenic and Historic Byway in 1989 and an All-American Road in September 1996.

== Gallery ==
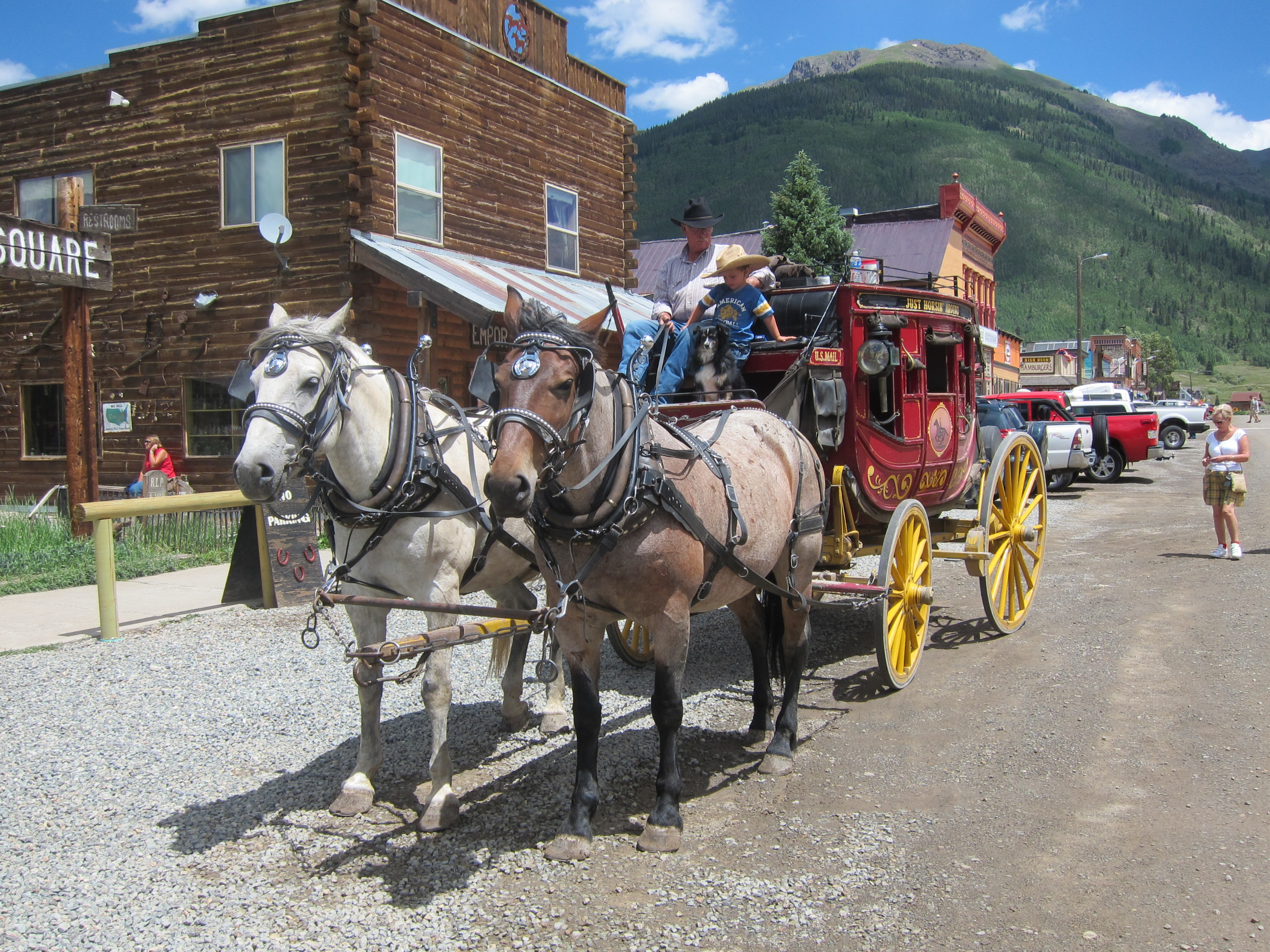
A stagecoach in Silverton

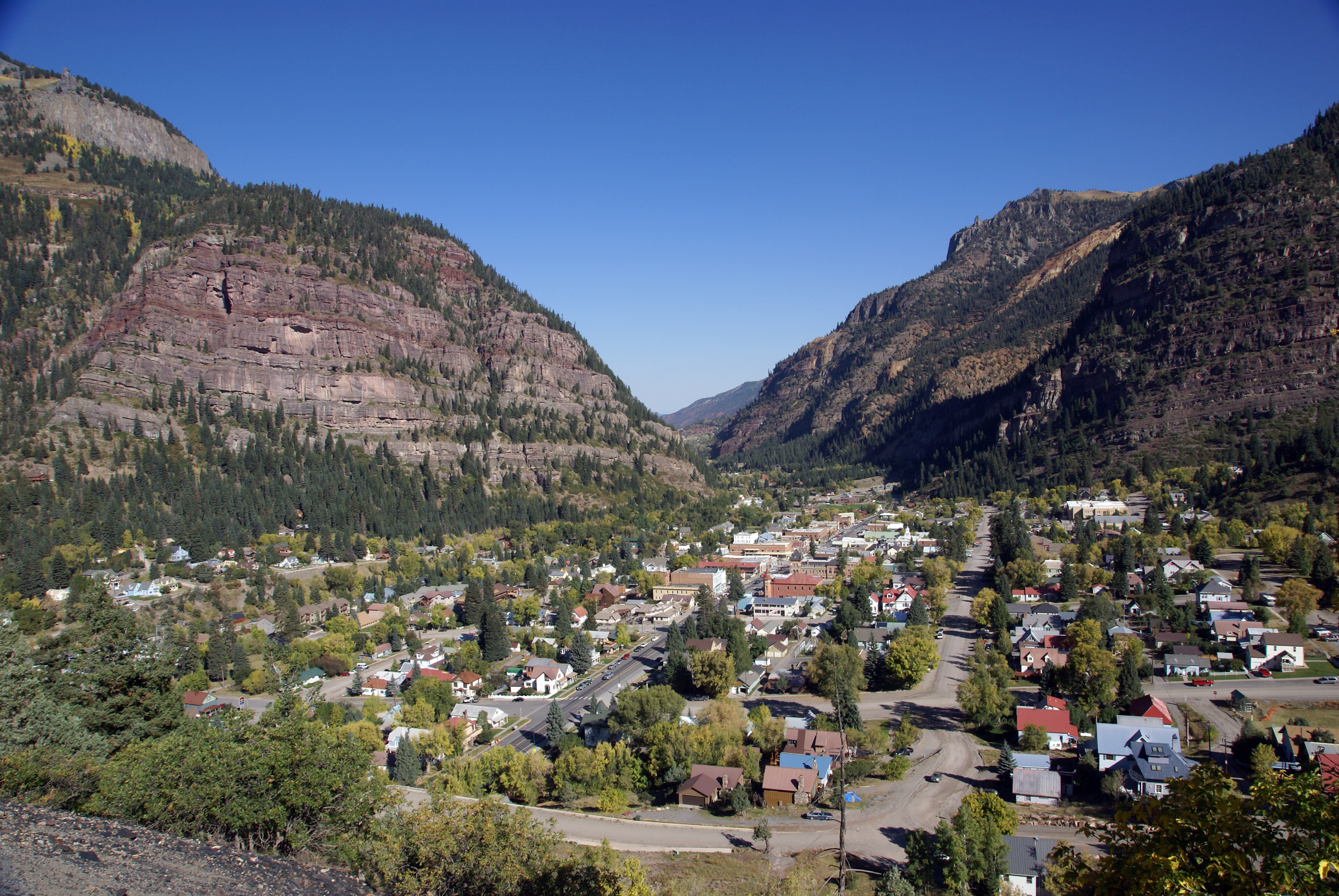
Ouray

== See also ==
- History Colorado
