= Cross Mountain (Colorado) =

Mountain in the state of Colorado

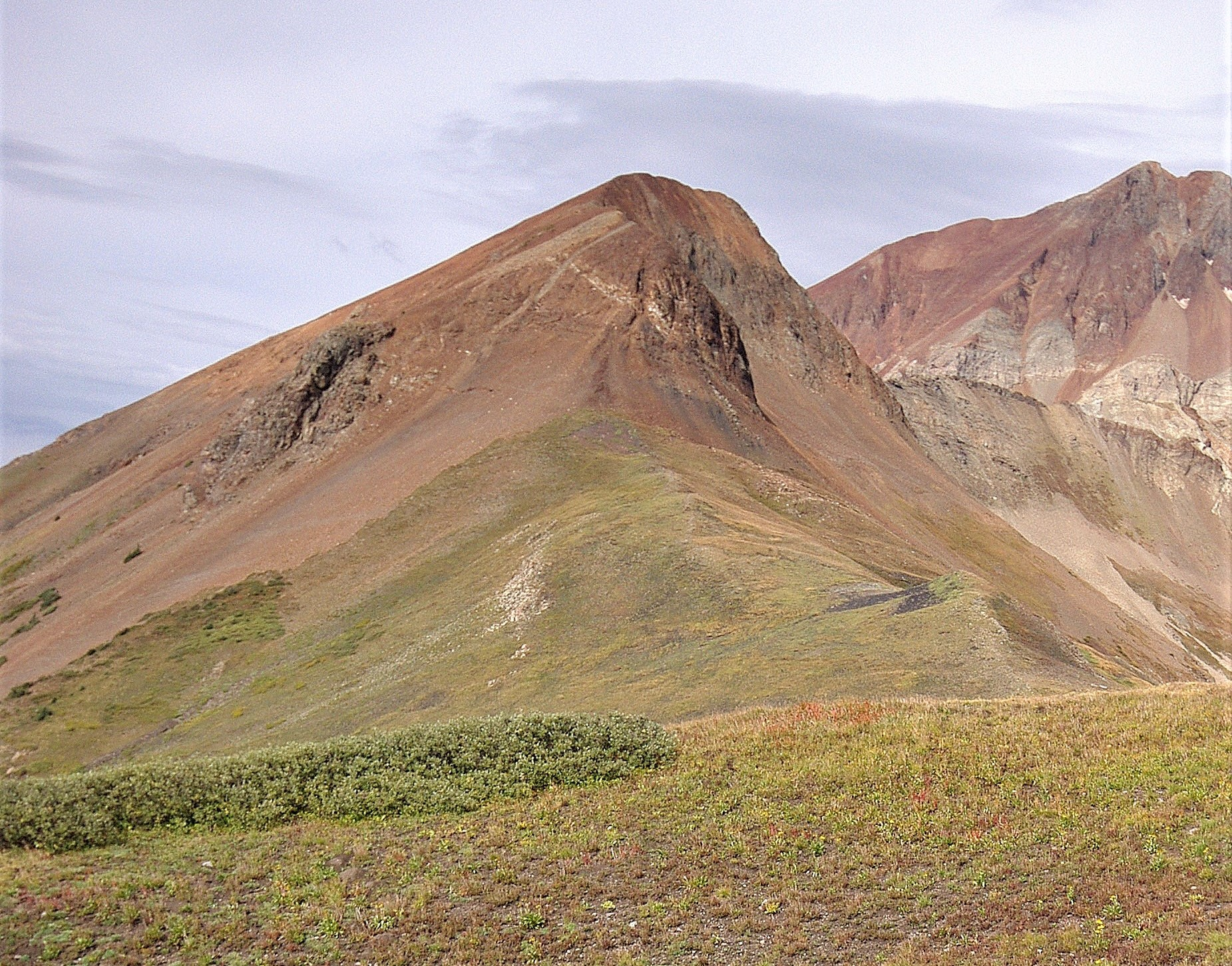
- East aspect

Highest point
- Elevation: 12,703 ft (3,872 m)
- Prominence: 203 ft (62 m)
- Parent peak: Gladstone Peak (13,919 ft)
- Isolation: 1.02 mi (1.64 km)
- Coordinates: 37°49′56″N 107°58′07″W

Geography
- Location within Colorado Location within the United States
- Country: United States
- State: Colorado
- County: Dolores / San Miguel
- Protected area: Lizard Head Wilderness
- Parent range: Rocky Mountains; San Juan Mountains; San Miguel Mountains
- Topo map: USGS Mount Wilson

Geology
- Rock age: Cretaceous
- Rock type(s): Mancos Shale and Igneous rock

Climbing
- Easiest route: class 2

Cross Mountain is a 12,703-foot-elevation (3,872-meter) summit on the border shared by Dolores and San Miguel County, in Colorado, United States.

== Description ==
Cross Mountain is located 11 miles (18 km) southwest of the community of Telluride in the Lizard Head Wilderness, on land administered by Uncompahgre National Forest and San Juan National Forest. It is situated west of the Continental Divide in the San Juan Mountains which are a subrange of the Rocky Mountains. Precipitation runoff from the mountain's south slope drains to the Dolores River via Slate Creek, whereas the north slope drains to the San Miguel River via Bilk Creek. Topographic relief is modest as the summit rises 2,100 feet (640 meters) above Slate Creek in 1.4 miles (2.3 km). An ascent of the summit involves hiking 4.3 miles (6.9 km) with 2,663 feet of elevation gain from the Cross Mountain Trailhead along Highway 145. The mountain's toponym has been officially adopted by the United States Board on Geographic Names.

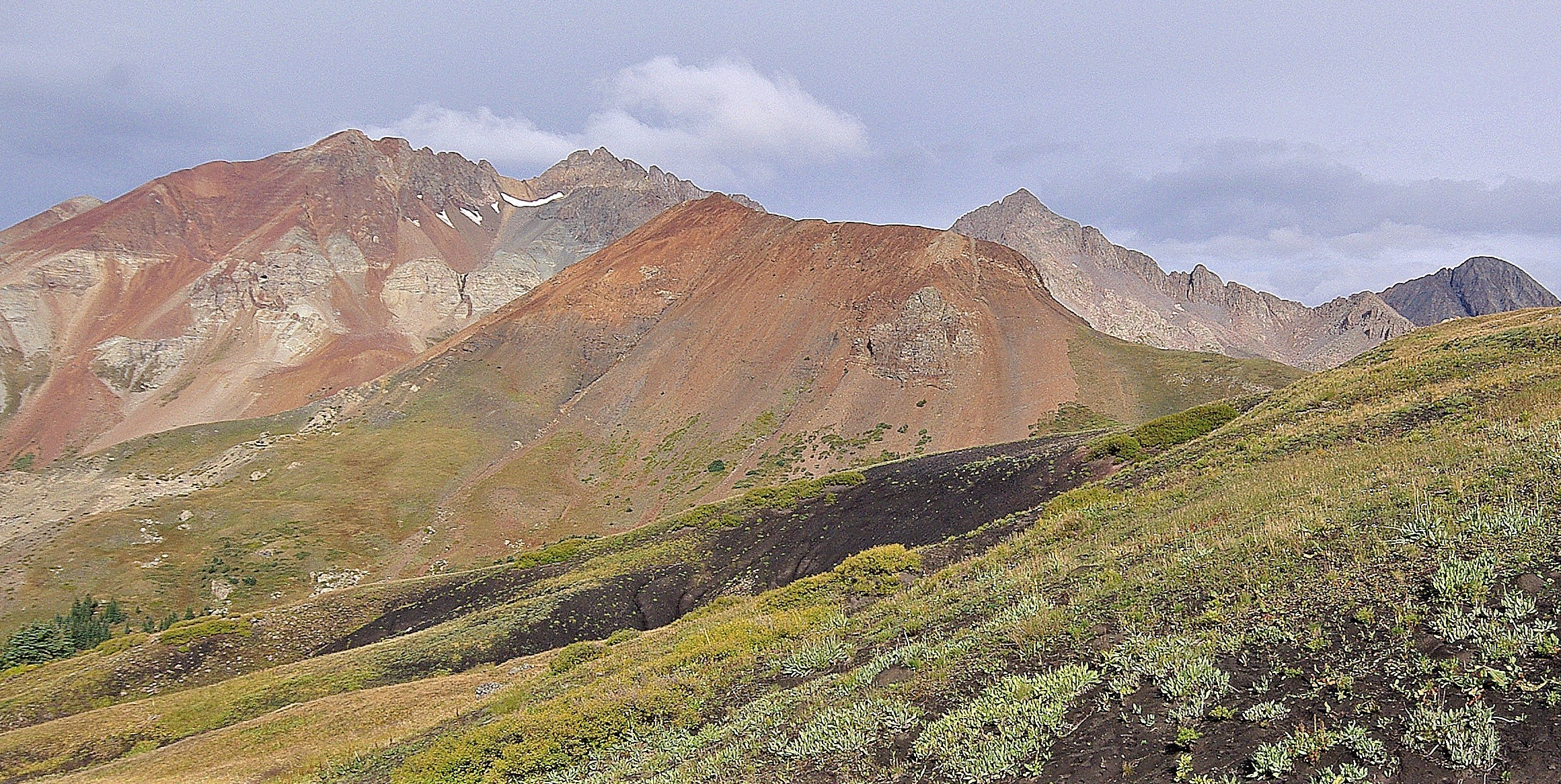
The reddish Cross Mountain centered, from southwest. (Mt. Wilson to the left)

== Climate ==
According to the Köppen climate classification system, Cross Mountain has an alpine climate with cold, snowy winters, and cool to warm summers. Due to its altitude, it receives precipitation all year, as snow in winter and as thunderstorms in summer, with a dry period in late spring. Climbers can expect afternoon rain, hail, and lightning from the seasonal monsoon in late July and August.

== See also ==
- Mountains of Dolores County, Colorado
