= Sunshine Mountain =

Mountain in the state of Colorado

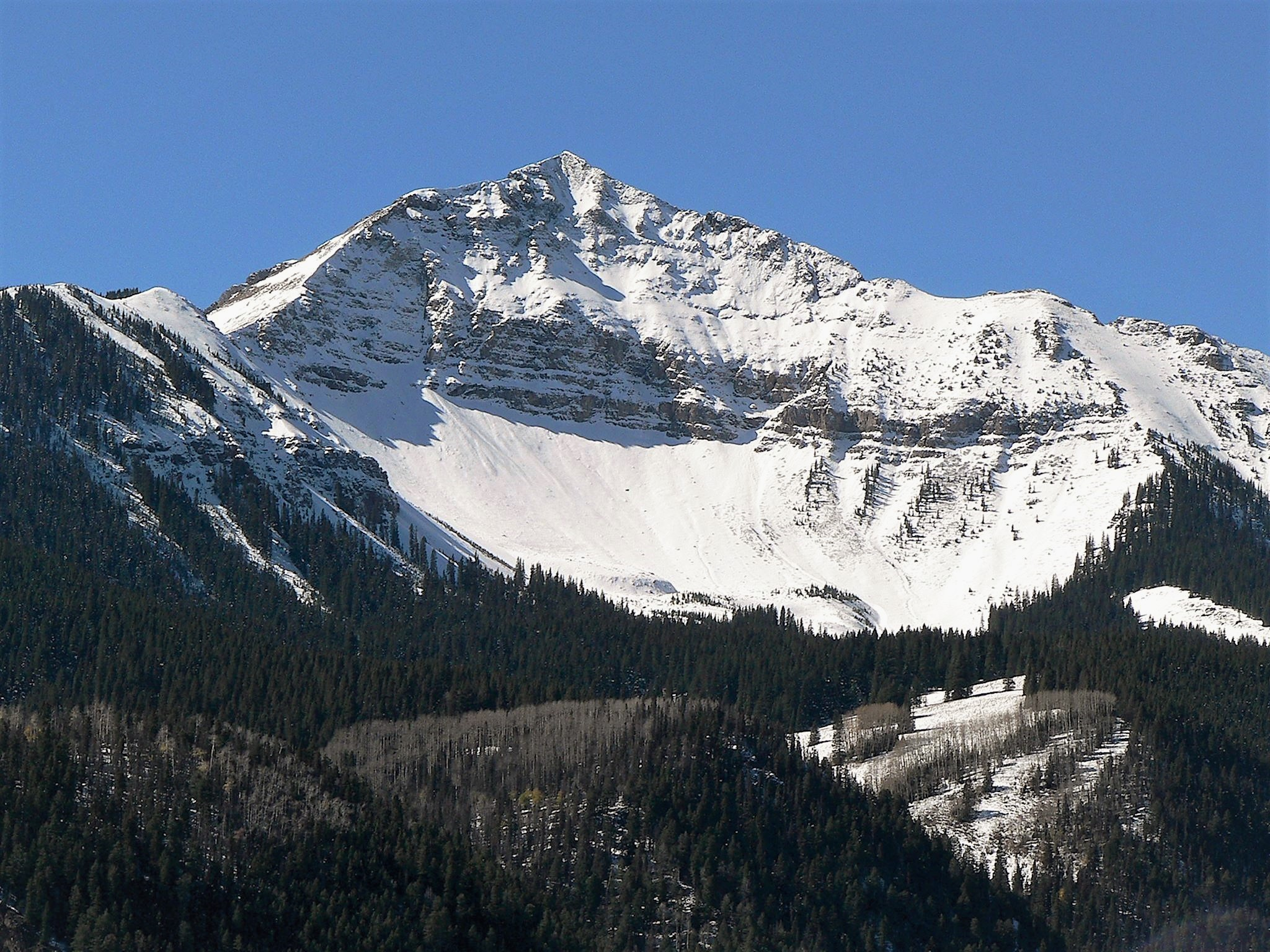
- Northeast aspect

Highest point
- Elevation: 12,930 ft (3,940 m)
- Prominence: 810 ft (250 m)
- Parent peak: Lizard Head (13,119 ft)
- Isolation: 1.79 mi (2.88 km)
- Coordinates: 37°51′30″N 107°56′03″W

Geography
- Location within Colorado Location within the United States
- Location: San Miguel County; Colorado, US
- Parent range: Rocky Mountains; San Juan Mountains
- Topo map: USGS Mount Wilson

Geology
- Rock age: Tertiary

Climbing
- Easiest route: class 2 East ridge

Sunshine Mountain is a 12,930-foot-elevation (3,940-meter) mountain summit located in San Miguel County, in Colorado, United States. It is situated nine miles southwest of the community of Telluride, in the Lizard Head Wilderness, on land managed by Uncompahgre National Forest. It is part of the San Juan Mountains which is a subset of the Rocky Mountains. Sunshine Mountain is situated 24 miles west of the Continental Divide, 2.75 miles east of Wilson Peak, and 1.8 mile northeast of Lizard Head, the nearest higher neighbor. Topographic relief is significant as the west aspect rises 2,700 feet (820 meters) above Bilk Creek in approximately one mile. The mountain is composed of rock of the San Juan Formation overlaying Telluride Conglomerate, in turn overlaying Mancos Shale. The mountain's name, which has been officially adopted by the United States Board on Geographic Names, was in use before 1899 when Henry Gannett published it in A Dictionary of Altitudes in the United States.

== Climate ==
According to the Köppen climate classification system, Sunshine Mountain is located in an alpine subarctic climate zone with long, cold, snowy winters, and cool to warm summers. Due to its altitude, it receives precipitation all year, as snow in winter, and as thunderstorms in summer, with a dry period in late spring. Precipitation runoff from the mountain drains into tributaries of the San Miguel River.

== Gallery ==
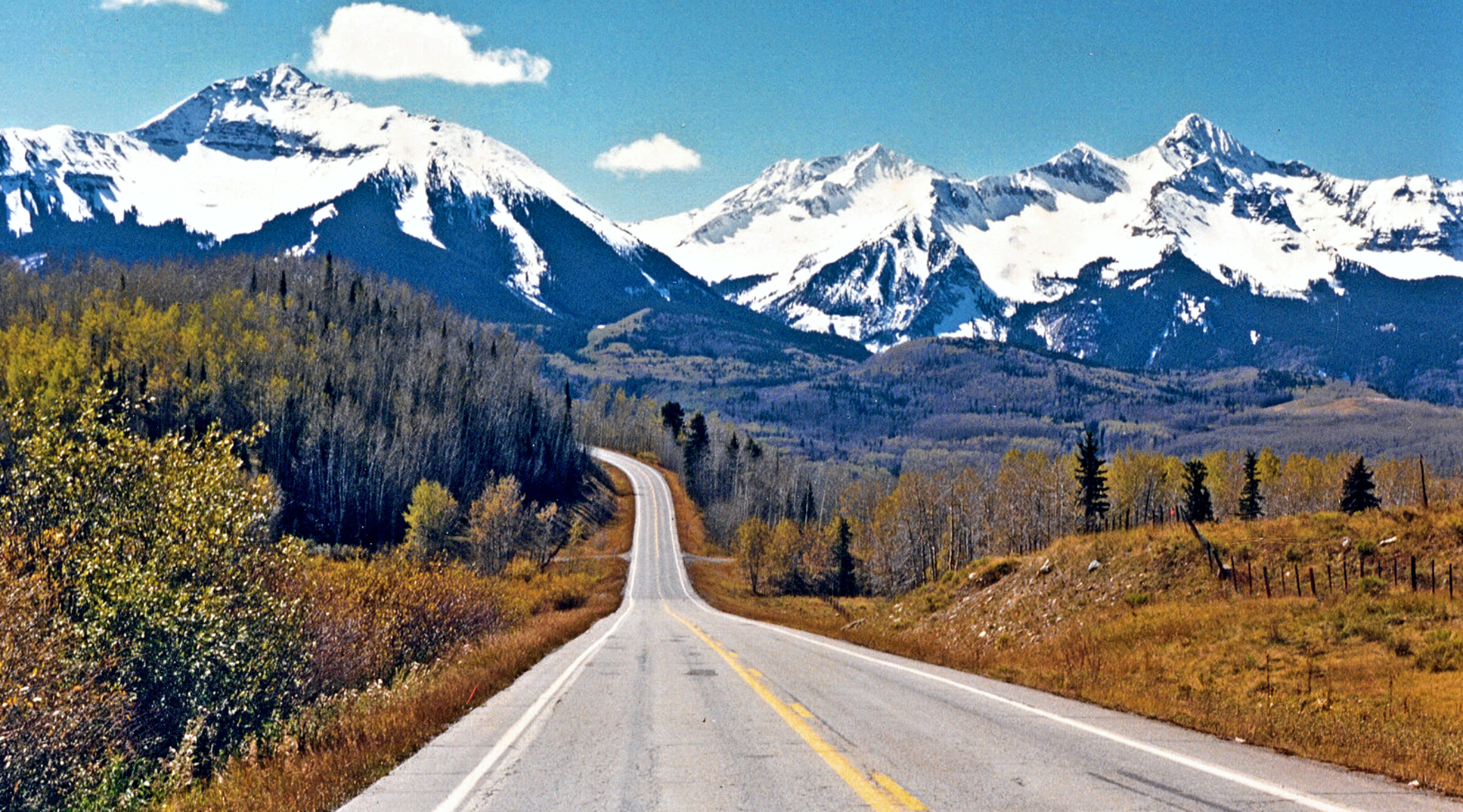
Sunshine Mountain (left) and Wilson Peak (right) from southbound Highway 145

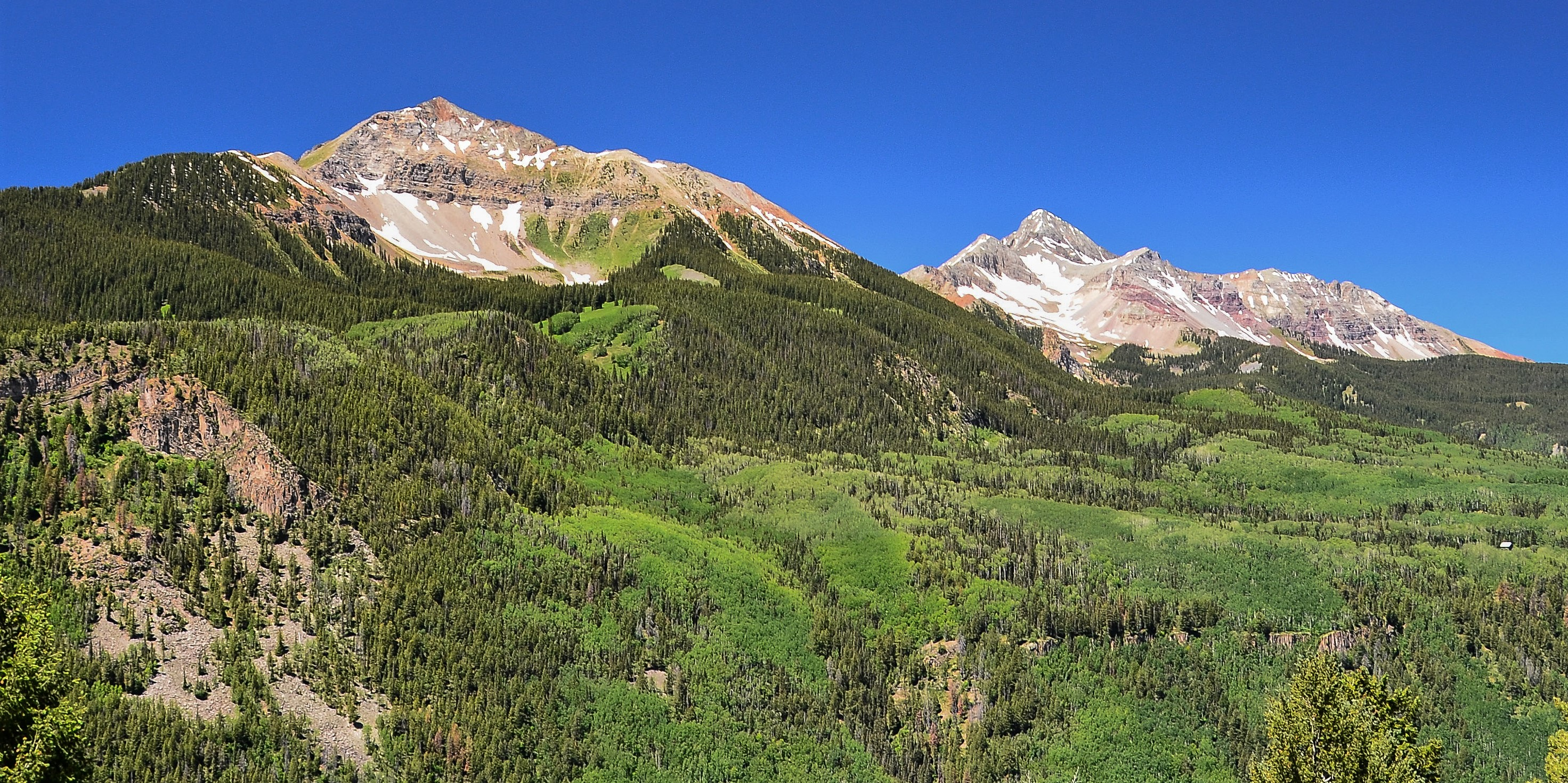
Sunshine Mountain (left) and Wilson Peak from the east

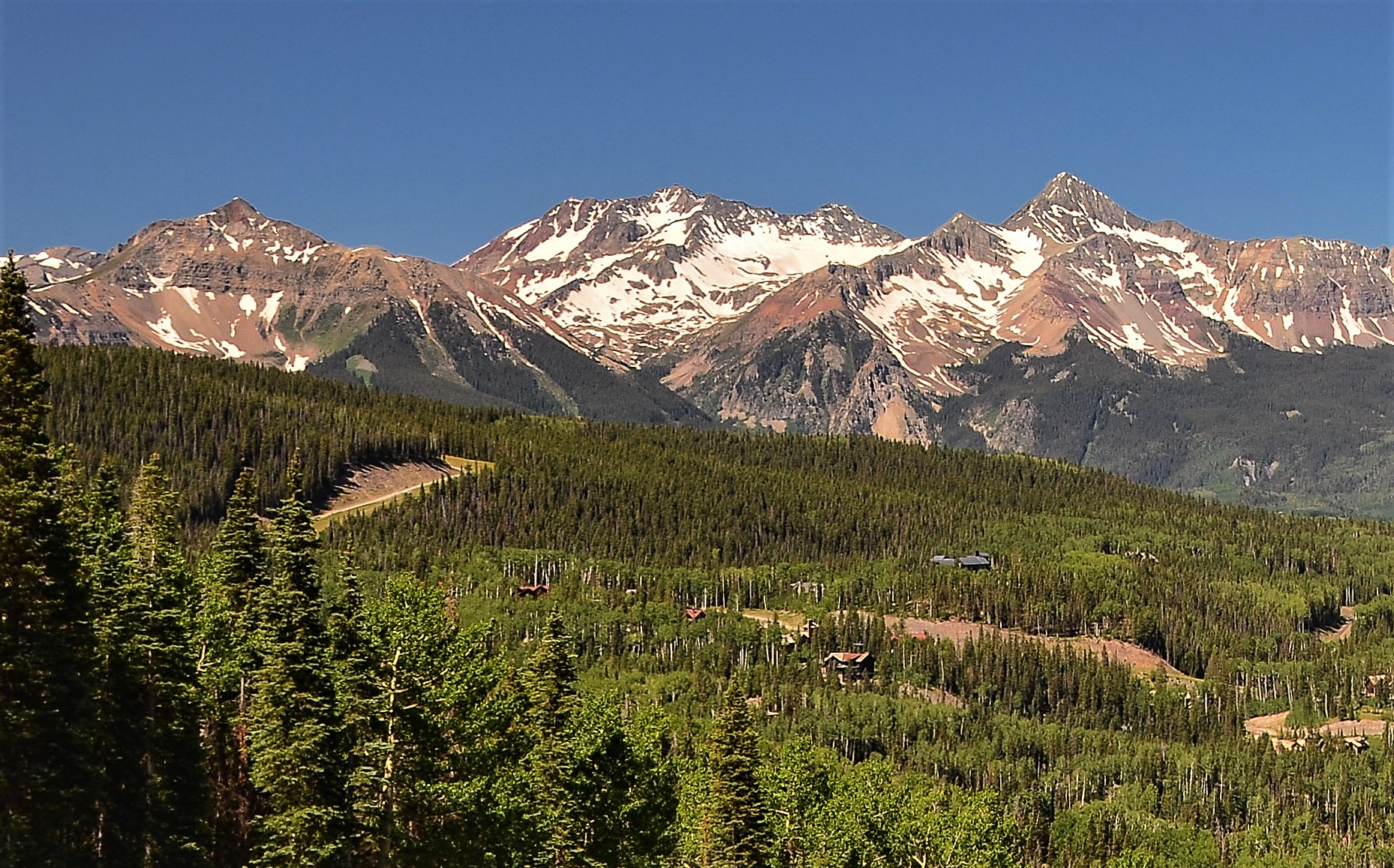
Sunshine Mountain (left), Mt. Wilson, Wilson Peak

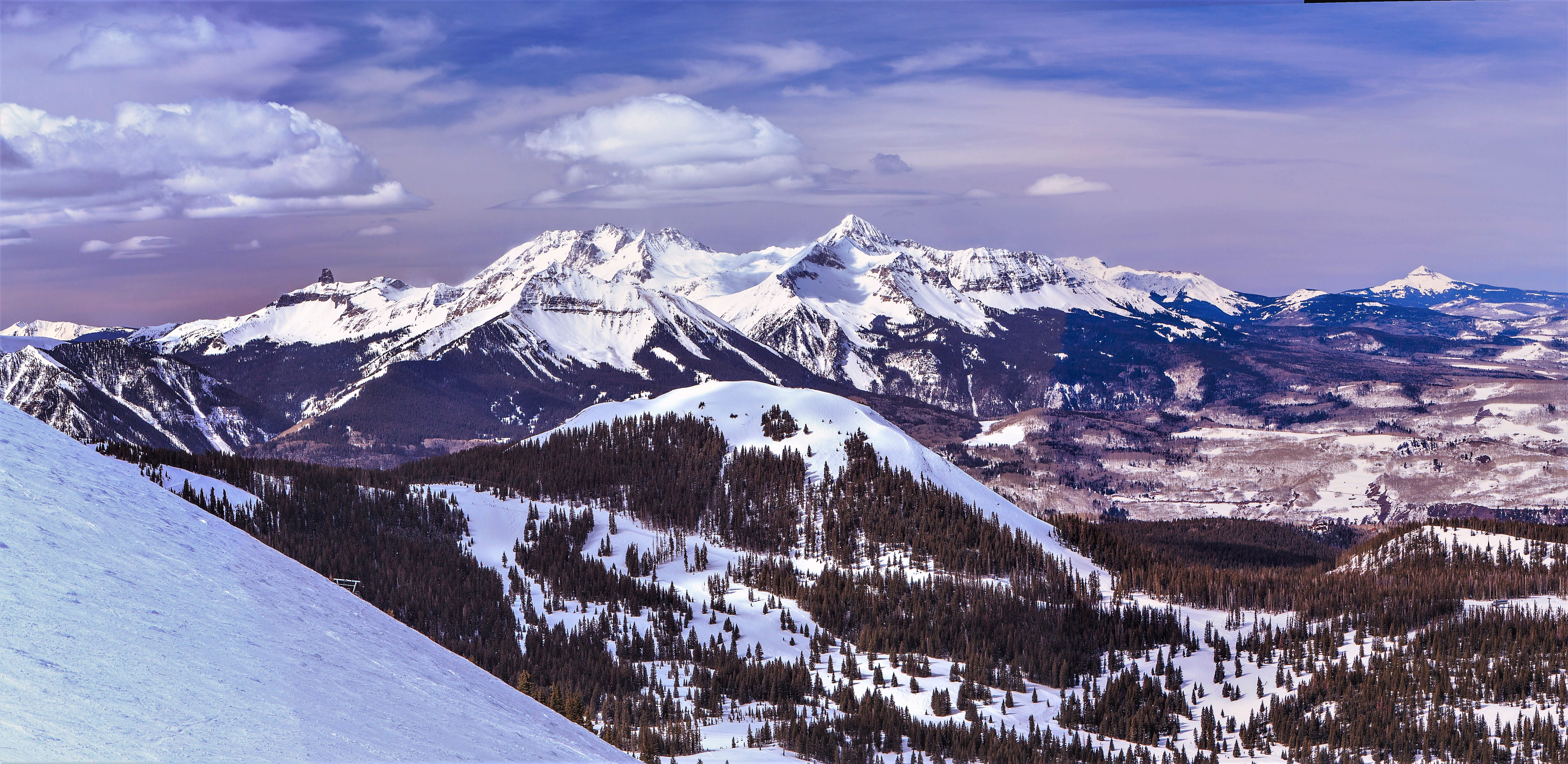
Lizard Head, Sunshine Mountain, Mt. Wilson, Wilson Peak from Telluride ski area

== See also ==
- Mountains of San Miguel County, Colorado
