= Lizard Head =

Mountain in Colorado, United States

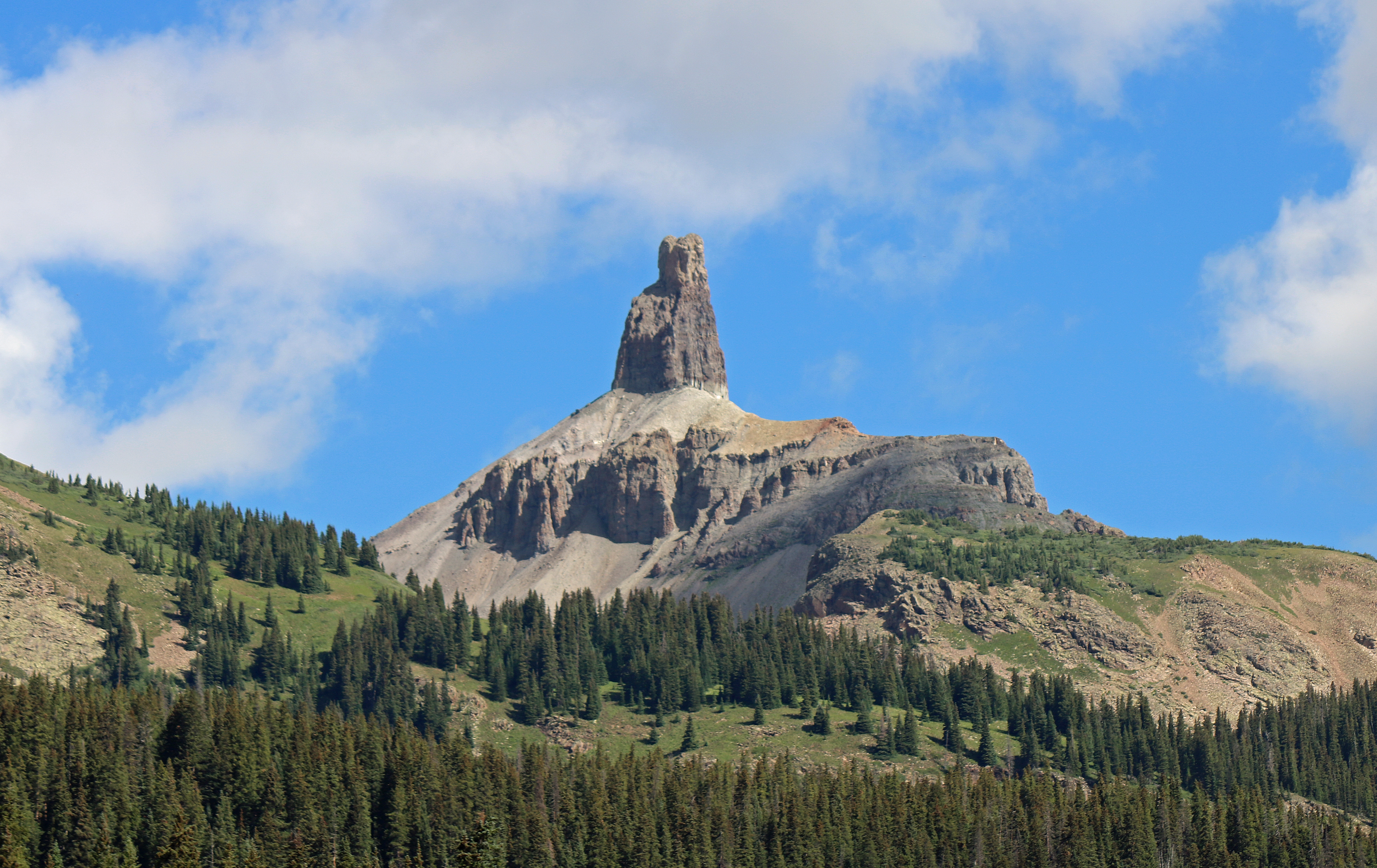

Highest point
- Elevation: 13,119 ft (3,999 m)
- Prominence: 1,134 ft (346 m)
- Isolation: 1.93 mi (3.11 km)
- Coordinates: 37°50′09″N 107°57′02″W

Geography
- Location within Colorado
- Location: Dolores and San Miguel counties, Colorado, United States
- Parent range: San Miguel Mountains
- Topo map(s): USGS 7.5' topographic map Mount Wilson, Colorado

Geology
- Rock age: Oligocene
- Mountain type: Ash flow tuff

Climbing
- First ascent: 1920 by Albert Ellingwood and Barton Hoag
- Easiest route: Technical climb; class 5.8

Lizard Head is a mountain summit in the San Miguel Mountains range of the Rocky Mountains of North America. The 13,119-foot (3,999 m) is located in the Lizard Head Wilderness, 6.8 miles (11.0 km) west by south (bearing 258°) of the town of Ophir, Colorado, United States, on the drainage divide separating San Juan National Forest and Dolores County from Uncompahgre National Forest and San Miguel County.

== Mountain ==
Lizard Head lies just southeast of a group of three Colorado fourteeners (mountains over 14,000 feet high), Mount Wilson, Wilson Peak, and El Diente Peak. Lizard Head is only the 556th highest peak in Colorado by most standard definitions, but its towering spire-like form makes it one of the most spectacular.

Lizard Head lies 2.84 mi (4.57 km) northwest of Colorado State Highway 145 at Lizard Head Pass. Lizards Head Trail climbs west from Trout Lake along Black Face Mountain ridge and past the south face of Lizard Head toward Wilson Peak.

The peak was used in a logo by the Rio Grande Southern Railroad.

== Geology ==
The rock spire of Lizard Head looks like an old eroded volcanic plug but it is actually composed of extrusive volcanic ash flows of Oligocene age resting on older sedimentary rocks of Eocene age.

== Climbing ==
Lizard Head is one of the most difficult summits in Colorado to climb. Describing the first ascent, Albert Ellingwood said:

A rottener mass of rock is inconceivable. The core may still be solid but the "surrounding tuffs" are seeking a lower level in large quantities. This far-advanced disintegration was our greatest obstacle. Absolutely the whole surface of the rock is loose and pebbles rain down from the sides as readily as needles from an aging Christmas tree. In many places one could with one hand pull down hundreds of pounds of fragments, and occasionally we could hear the crashing of small avalanches that fell without human prompting.

The first ascent team completed the climb and descent safely.

== Appearance ==
The appearance of the peak is reported to have changed significantly due to a landslide in 1911. From the December 29 edition of the Mancos Times-Tribune of that year:

Lizard Head has fallen

The skyline of the mountains to the southwest of Telluride was changed last night when through some mighty upheaval of nature, the taller spire of Lizard Head fell with a roar to the depths below.

During the night people living on the mesas near Ophir heard a sliding, grinding noise, which disturbed the atmosphere and gave the impression of an earthquake. This morning they discovered that the upstanding rock which had been given the name of Lizard Head was gone.

The smaller spire which was formerly inconspicuous by the side of the head is now standing single and alone, pointing to the sky, a long sentinel of last night’s upheaval. Millions of tons of rocks, conglomerate and earth went down without apparent cause or reason.

There are several photographs of the peak from before the landslide. Before-and-after photographs taken from the north and shown in The RGS Story indicate substantial change. The earlier photograph shows a taller squared-off peak that would be more suggestive of a lizard's head.

Before-and-after photos shown in Jackson and Fielder's Colorado 1870-2000 taken from the south do not show as much change in appearance, indicating that the area of collapse was on the northern side.

== Historical names ==
- Lizard Head
- Lizard Head Peak
- Lizards Head

== See also ==
- List of Colorado mountain ranges
- List of Colorado mountain summits
  - List of Colorado fourteeners
  - List of Colorado 4000 meter prominent summits
  - List of the most prominent summits of Colorado
- List of Colorado county high points
