= Vermilion Peak =

Mountain in Colorado, United States

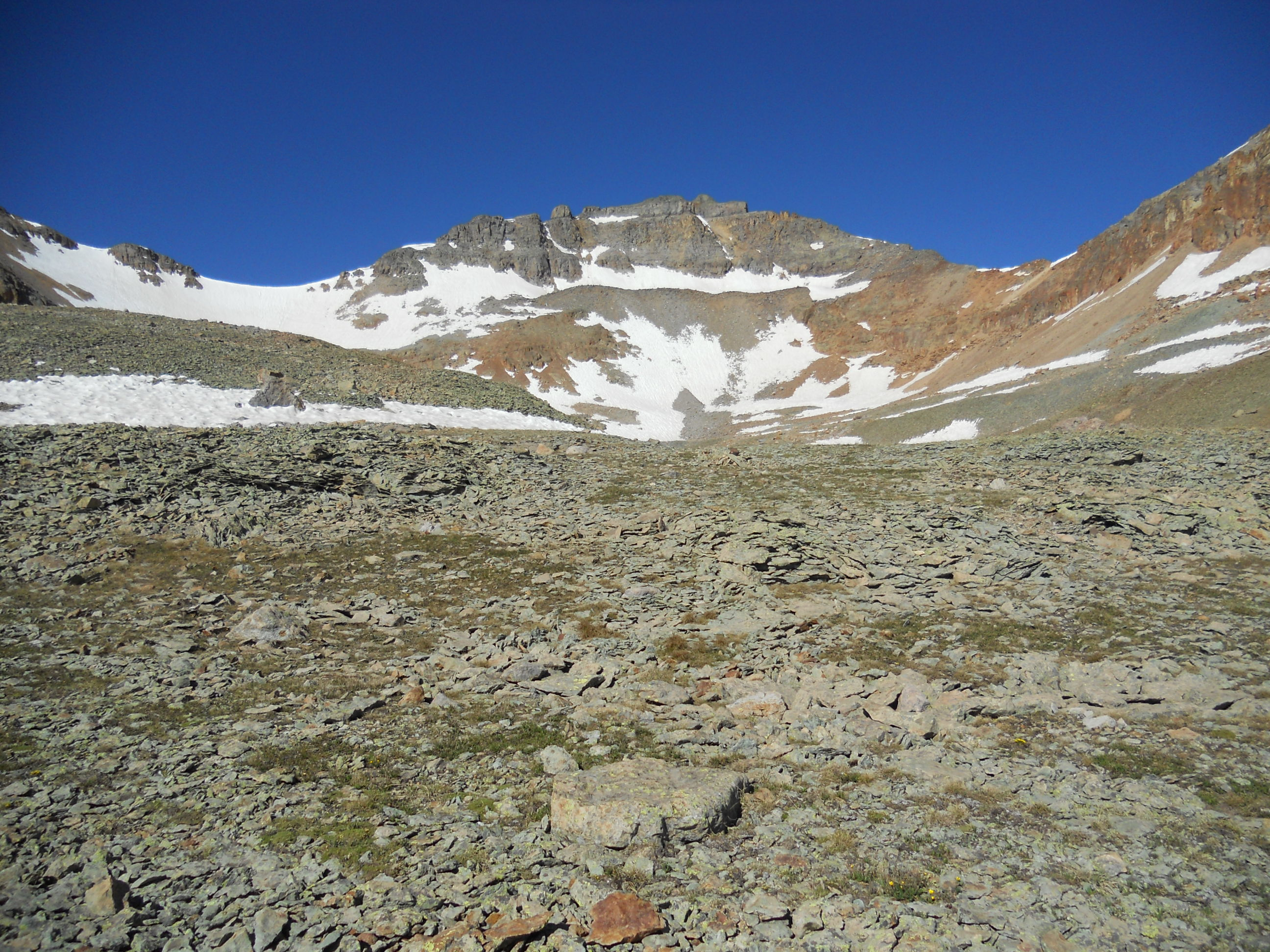
- Vermilion Peak viewed from the east.

Highest point
- Elevation: 13,900 ft (4,200 m); NAVD88
- Prominence: 2105 ft (642 m)
- Parent peak: Gladstone Peak
- Isolation: 9.07 mi (14.60 km)
- Listing: North America highest peaks 66th; US highest major peaks 50th; Colorado highest major peaks 28th; Colorado county high points 22nd
- Coordinates: 37°47′57″N 107°49′42″W

Geography
- Location within Colorado
- Location: San Miguel County and the high point of San Juan County, Colorado, United States
- Parent range: San Juan Mountains
- Topo map(s): USGS 7.5' topographic map Ophir, Colorado

Vermilion Peak is a mountain in Colorado. It is one of 637 Colorado peaks above 13,000 feet (13,900 ft). It is located in the San Juan Range, and is the 74th highest mountain in Colorado. It is named Vermilion Peak because of the red-orange color it takes on when the sun shines on it. It is 9.7 miles ESE of Gladstone Peak.

== See also ==
- List of mountain peaks of North America
  - List of mountain peaks of the United States
    - List of mountain peaks of Colorado
      - List of Colorado county high points
