= Calico National Recreation Trail =

Trail in Colorado, United States

Coordinates: 37°44′37″N 108°04′54″W

Calico National Recreation Trail, also known as the Upper Calico Trail, is located in the Dolores Ranger District of San Juan National Forest, the 5.5 mile Upper Calico Trail is rated moderate/difficult and has a starting elevation of 10,150' and an ending elevation of 10,400' (junction with Falls Creek Trail #640).

Part of the National Recreation Trail (NRT), Upper Calico Trail is a single-track trail which makes its way over and around several peaks, and along fairly long stretches of narrow ridgelines. The Upper Calico NRT terminates at the junction with Fall Creek Trail and the lower portion of the Calico Trail.

The trail is located near Dolores, Colorado, and Rico, Colorado, in Dolores County, Colorado.

== See also ==
- Colorado Scenic and Historic Byways
- List of Colorado state parks
- List of Colorado trails
- State of Colorado
