= Mount Wilson (Colorado) =

Summit in Colorado, United States

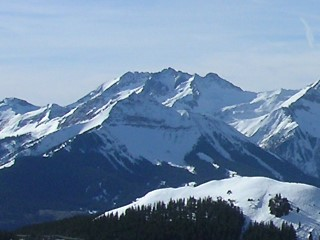
- Mount Wilson

Highest point
- Elevation: 14,254.1 ft (4,344.6 m); NAPGD2022
- Prominence: 4,024 ft (1,227 m)
- Isolation: 33.0 mi (53.1 km)
- Listing: North America highest peaks 43rd; US highest major peaks 29th; Colorado highest major peaks 14th; Colorado fourteeners 16th; Colorado county high points 15th
- Coordinates: 37°50′21″N 107°59′29″W

Geography
- Location within Colorado
- Location: High point of Dolores County, Colorado, United States
- Parent range: Highest summit of the San Miguel Mountains
- Topo map(s): USGS 7.5' topographic map Mount Wilson, Colorado

Climbing
- First ascent: September 13, 1874, by A. D. Wilson, Franklin Rhoda, and others (Hayden Survey party)
- Easiest route: Southwest Slopes: Scramble, class 3

Mount Wilson is the highest summit of the San Miguel Mountains range of the Rocky Mountains of North America. The prominent 14,254.1-foot (4,345 m) fourteener is located in the Lizard Head Wilderness of San Juan National Forest, 10.6 miles (17.1 km) north by east (bearing 12°) of the Town of Rico in Dolores County, Colorado, United States. (Note: The elevation of Mount Wilson includes an adjustment of +1.899 m (+6.23 ft) from NGVD 29 to NAVD 88.) Mount Wilson should not be confused with the lower Wilson Peak nearby.

The peak was named for A.D. Wilson, a topographer with the Hayden Survey. He was in the first ascent party, which climbed the peak on September 13, 1874, via the south ridge (a difficult route, not often climbed today).

== Climbing ==
Mount Wilson is ranked among the top ten hardest of the Colorado fourteeners to climb. The standard climbing route ascends the North Face from Navajo Basin. Some permanent snowfields exist high in the basin (sometimes termed "Navajo Glacier") and the climb usually involves snow travel, with ice axe and crampons recommended. Scrambling on rock then leads to the summit.

A popular, though long, outing for expert climbers is the mile-long ridge connecting Mount Wilson to El Diente Peak. The ridge is sharp and rocky, and requires difficult scrambling and often a small amount of rappelling.

=== Incidents ===
In 2010, experienced climber Peter Topp, was killed in a rockslide and lightning storm while traversing the Mount Wilson traverse to El Diente Peak with a small climbing party. Two other climbers were seriously injured in the accident.

In July 2024, 21-year old hiker John James Coffee was fatally injured while traversing the ridge between Wilson Peak and El Diente Peak. Coffee fell over 800 feet to his death and was found after failing to return home from his hike.

== Geology and history ==
Mount Wilson, and the rest of the San Miguel Mountains, are made up of a large, irregular tertiary igneous intrusion.

The Mount Wilson region became the site of intense mining activity, particularly for silver, in the early 1880s. The most famous of these mines was the Silver Pick Mine, which gave its name to Silver Pick Basin, just north of Navajo Basin.

=== Glaciers and permafrost ===
Mount Wilson contains four small glaciers on its summit, these being the southernmost modern glaciers in the Rocky Mountains and indeed the most southerly in the contiguous US outside the Sierra Nevada in California. These descend to 3,887 meters (12,753 ft). None of the glaciers have ever been named, and it has never been investigated whether they are presently active. At least nine rock glaciers, composed of alpine permafrost, exist on the northern slope of the mountain, extending down to around 10,000 feet (3,050 m), although the lower limit of permafrost is more typically around 11,500 feet (3,500 m).

During the Pleistocene glaciers were much more extensive than today, covering the whole summit plateau In glaciations previous to the Wisconsinian, it is generally thought that summit ice caps were even more extensive and joined to form the "San Miguel Glacier" with icecaps in the San Juan Mountains.

== Climate ==
Climate data for Mount Wilson 37.8368 N, 107.9914 W, Elevation: 13,606 ft (4,147 m) (1991–2020 normals)
Month	Jan	Feb	Mar	Apr	May	Jun	Jul	Aug	Sep	Oct	Nov	Dec	Year
Mean daily maximum °F (°C)	24.4 (−4.2)	24.1 (−4.4)	28.5 (−1.9)	33.6 (0.9)	42.1 (5.6)	53.7 (12.1)	58.4 (14.7)	56.2 (13.4)	50.4 (10.2)	40.9 (4.9)	31.1 (−0.5)	24.6 (−4.1)	39.0 (3.9)
Daily mean °F (°C)	12.4 (−10.9)	11.7 (−11.3)	15.8 (−9.0)	20.4 (−6.4)	29.0 (−1.7)	39.6 (4.2)	45.1 (7.3)	43.4 (6.3)	37.3 (2.9)	28.2 (−2.1)	19.4 (−7.0)	13.0 (−10.6)	26.3 (−3.2)
Mean daily minimum °F (°C)	0.4 (−17.6)	−0.6 (−18.1)	3.0 (−16.1)	7.3 (−13.7)	15.8 (−9.0)	25.4 (−3.7)	31.7 (−0.2)	30.6 (−0.8)	24.2 (−4.3)	15.5 (−9.2)	7.8 (−13.4)	1.3 (−17.1)	13.5 (−10.3)
Average precipitation inches (mm)	4.91 (125)	4.43 (113)	4.51 (115)	4.94 (125)	4.10 (104)	1.17 (30)	3.21 (82)	3.21 (82)	3.07 (78)	3.32 (84)	4.43 (113)	4.89 (124)	46.19 (1,175)
Source: PRISM Climate Group

== Historical names ==
- Glacier Mountain
- Mount Wilson – 1906

== See also ==
- List of mountain peaks of North America
  - List of mountain peaks of the United States
    - List of mountain peaks of Colorado
      - List of Colorado county high points
      - List of Colorado fourteeners

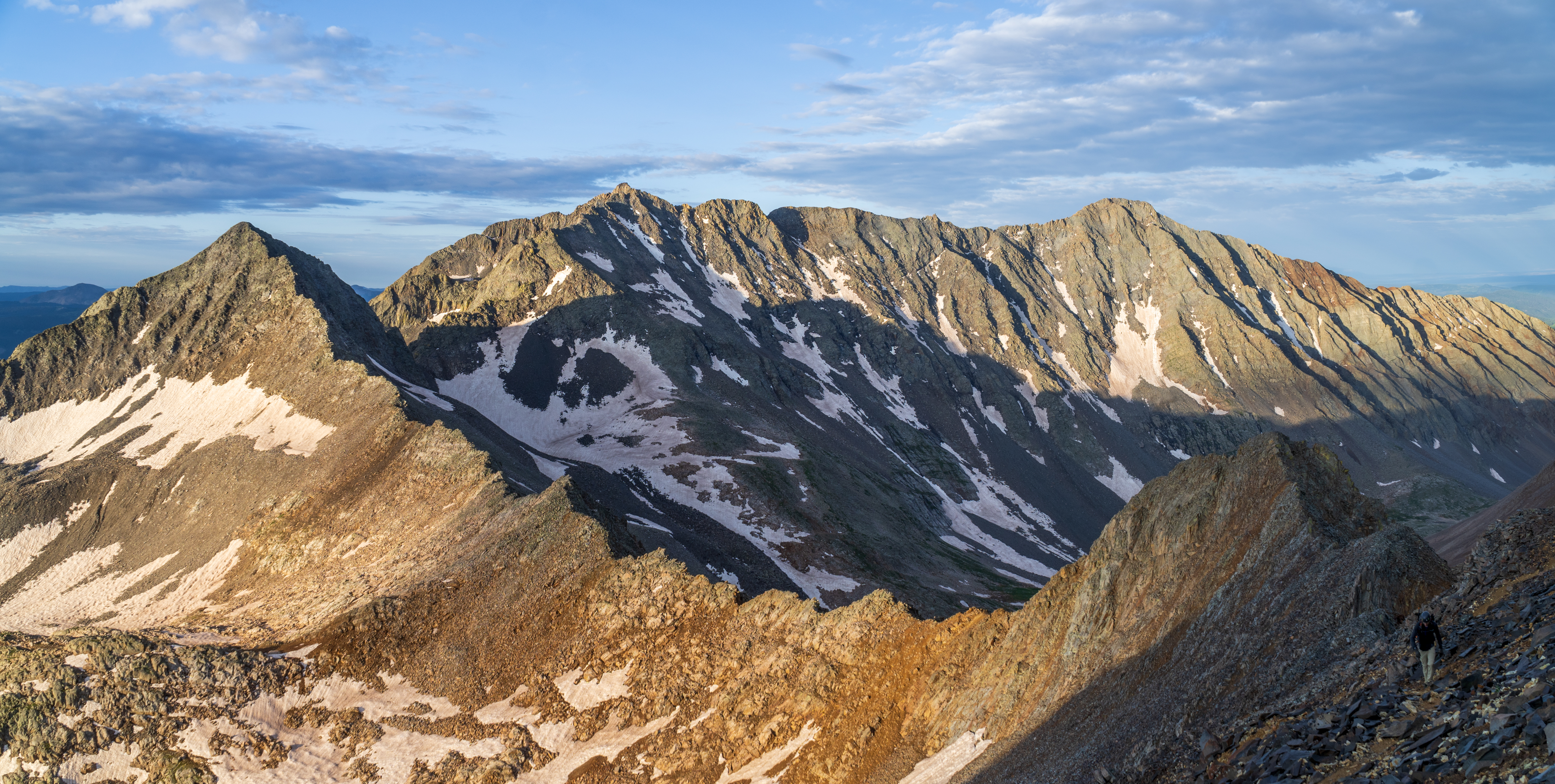
North aspect of Mount Wilson seen from Wilson Peak. Gladstone Peak to left.
