= Lizard Head Pass =

Mountain pass in Colorado, USA

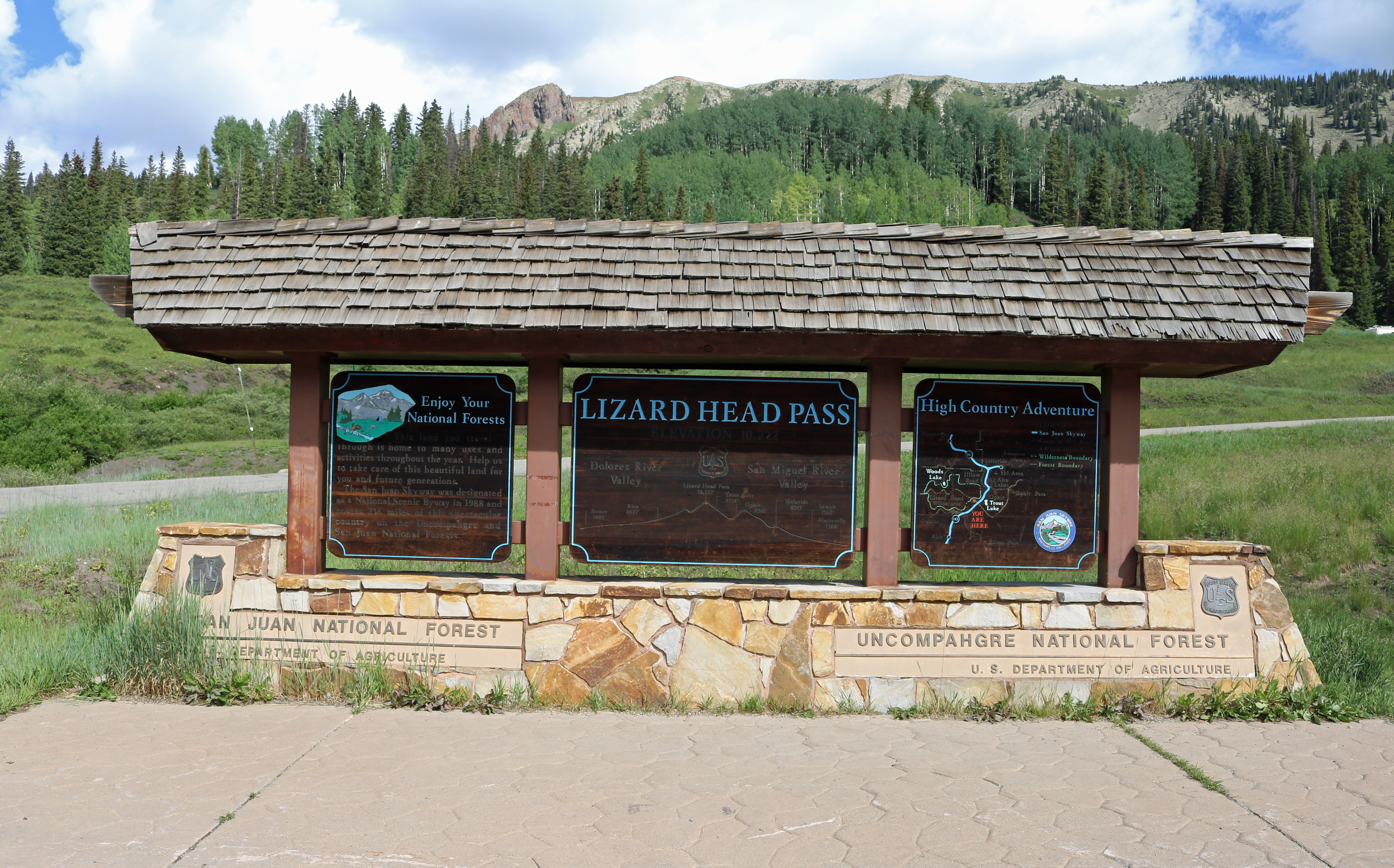
- The sign at the top of the pass
- Interactive map of Lizard Head Pass
- Elevation: 10,222 ft (3,116 m)
- Traversed by: State Highway 145

Third Approach
- Location: Dolores / San Miguel counties, Colorado, United States
- Range: San Juan Mountains
- Coordinates: 37°48.7′N 107°54.5′W
- Topo map: Ophir

Lizard Head Pass, elevation 10,222 feet (3,116 m), is a mountain pass in the San Juan Mountains of Colorado, on the border between Dolores and San Miguel counties.

It is also on the divide between the watersheds of the Dolores River and San Miguel River. The pass lies in the saddle between Lizard Head and Sheep Mountain.

== History ==
The pass is named for a prominent nearby peak, the 12,995 ft (3,961 m) spire of Lizard Head. The pass is currently traversed by State Highway 145, about 12 miles south of the Telluride turnoff.

It was also used by the historic Rio Grande Southern Railroad until 1952. Although the grades on both sides of the pass are mild for automobile traffic, this was a significant obstacle for the railroad, and this was a factor leading to the use of the Galloping Goose railcars.

== Climate ==
Climate data for Lizard Head Pass, Colorado, 1991–2020 normals: 10200ft (3109m)
Month	Jan	Feb	Mar	Apr	May	Jun	Jul	Aug	Sep	Oct	Nov	Dec	Year
Mean daily maximum °F (°C)	33.9 (1.1)	35.2 (1.8)	41.6 (5.3)	46.3 (7.9)	54.4 (12.4)	64.5 (18.1)	68.6 (20.3)	66.1 (18.9)	60.6 (15.9)	51.1 (10.6)	41.0 (5.0)	33.3 (0.7)	49.7 (9.8)
Daily mean °F (°C)	20.4 (−6.4)	21.3 (−5.9)	27.2 (−2.7)	32.8 (0.4)	40.7 (4.8)	49.0 (9.4)	54.1 (12.3)	52.3 (11.3)	46.6 (8.1)	37.6 (3.1)	27.7 (−2.4)	20.1 (−6.6)	35.8 (2.1)
Mean daily minimum °F (°C)	6.9 (−13.9)	7.4 (−13.7)	12.7 (−10.7)	19.3 (−7.1)	26.9 (−2.8)	33.4 (0.8)	39.6 (4.2)	38.5 (3.6)	32.6 (0.3)	24.3 (−4.3)	14.3 (−9.8)	6.9 (−13.9)	21.9 (−5.6)
Average precipitation inches (mm)	2.62 (67)	2.40 (61)	2.50 (64)	2.57 (65)	2.28 (58)	0.93 (24)	2.81 (71)	2.87 (73)	2.58 (66)	2.43 (62)	2.41 (61)	2.53 (64)	28.93 (736)
Source 1: XMACIS2
Source 2: NOAA (Precipitation)

== See also ==
- Mountain passes of Colorado
- San Juan Mountains (Colorado)
