= El Diente Peak =

Mountain in the state of Colorado

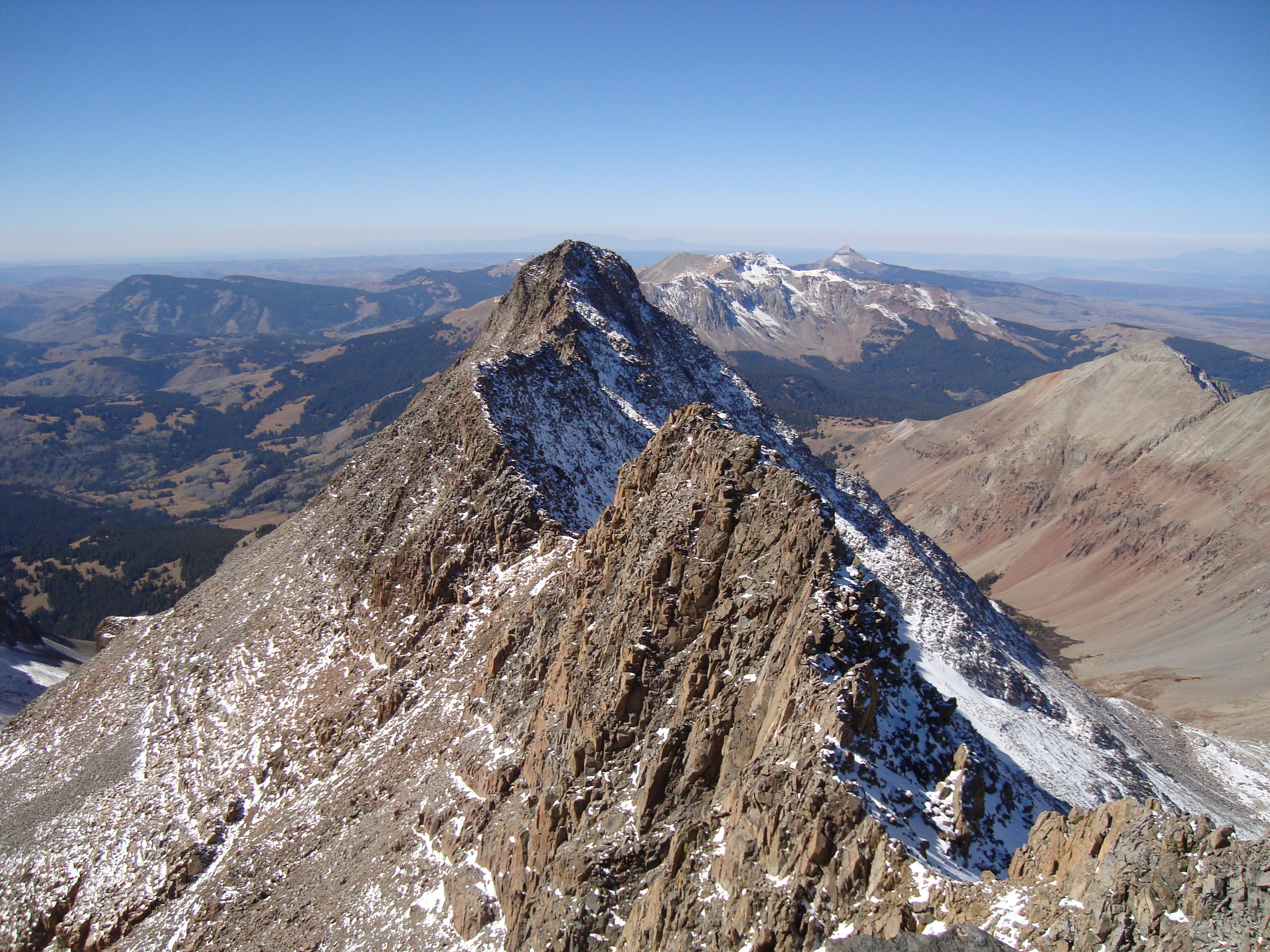
- El Diente Peak from Mount Wilson

Highest point
- Elevation: 14,165 ft (4,317 m)
- Prominence: 239 ft (73 m)
- Parent peak: Mount Wilson
- Isolation: 0.75 mi (1.21 km)
- Coordinates: 37°50′22″N 108°00′19″W

Naming
- English translation: The Tooth
- Language of name: Spanish

Geography
- Location within Colorado
- Location: Dolores County, Colorado, U.S.
- Parent range: San Juan Mountains
- Topo map(s): USGS 7.5' topographic map Dolores Peak, Colorado

Climbing
- Easiest route: South Slopes: Scramble, class 3

El Diente Peak is a high summit in the San Juan Mountains range of the Rocky Mountains of North America. The 14,165-foot (4,317 m) peak is located in the Lizard Head Wilderness of San Juan National Forest, 10.5 miles (16.9 km) north by east (bearing 8°) of the Town of Rico in Dolores County, Colorado, United States. "El Diente" is Spanish for "The Tooth", a reference to the shape of the peak.

== Climbing ==
The topographic prominence of El Diente Peak is only 239 feet (73 m), so by a strict 300-foot (91 m) cutoff rule, it would not be counted as a separate peak from its higher neighbor Mount Wilson. However, the 3/4 mile (1.2 km) connecting ridge is a significant climbing challenge (Class 4/5), making El Diente more independent than its prominence would indicate. Hence, it is often regarded as a full-fledged fourteener.

El Diente is one of the more dramatic peaks in Colorado in terms of local relief and steepness. As a result, it is one of the most challenging climbs among Colorado's fourteeners. All routes involve at least class 3 scrambling on loose talus, and poor route-finding can expose the climber to more difficult and dangerous terrain.

=== Incidents ===
As with all high peaks, El Diente has risks for climbers and mountaineers.

- In 2010, experienced climber John Arthur Merrill was killed in a rock slide on El Diente's south face while hiking with his dog.
- In 2019, a climber was rescued after surviving a 600-foot fall from El Diente after landing in an avalanche chute. While seriously injured, the climber was rescued by helicopter after activating an emergency signal on his GPS device.
- In 2020, climber Regina Stump fell 60 feet from El Diente after a boulder she was scrambling came loose. After breaking a wrist she was able to climb to safety.
- In 2022, a climber fell from El Diente Peak and broke his leg. He was rescued after calling for help from his inReach device.

== Historical names ==
- El Diente
- El Diente Peak

== See also ==
- List of mountain peaks of Colorado
  - List of Colorado fourteeners
