= Wilson Peak =

Mountain in Colorado, United States

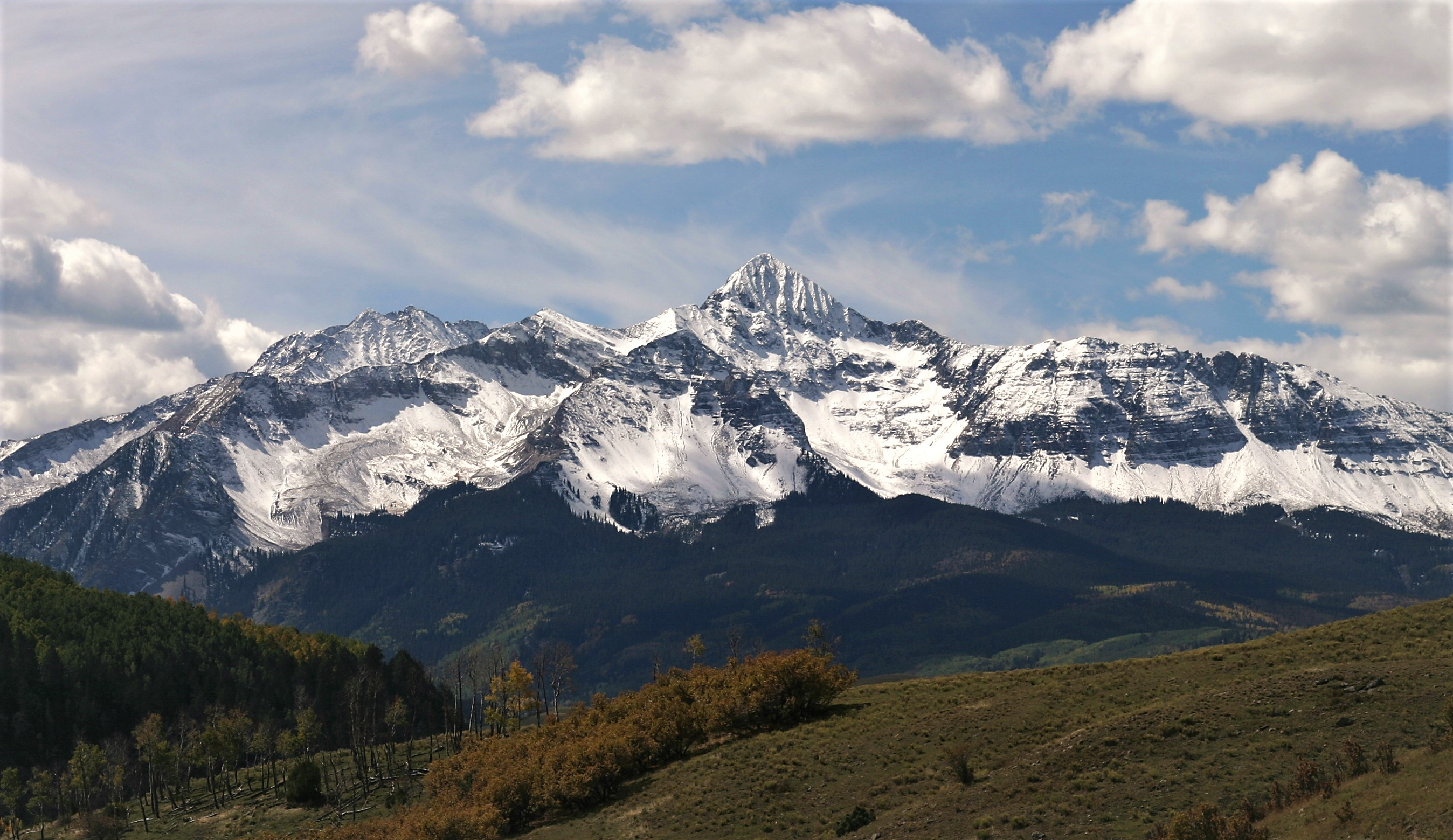
- North aspect

Highest point
- Elevation: 14,020.4 ft (4,273.4 m); NAPGD2022
- Prominence: 857 ft (261 m)
- Isolation: 1.51 mi (2.43 km)
- Listing: Colorado fourteeners 48th; Colorado county high points 19th
- Coordinates: 37°51′37″N 107°59′05″W

Geography
- Location within Colorado
- Location: High point of San Miguel County, Colorado, United States
- Parent range: San Miguel Mountains
- Topo map(s): USGS 7.5' topographic map Mount Wilson, Colorado

Climbing
- Easiest route: Southwest Ridge: Scramble, class 3

Wilson Peak is a 14,020.4-foot (4,273 m) mountain peak in the U.S. state of Colorado. It is located in the Lizard Head Wilderness of the Uncompahgre National Forest, in the northwestern San Juan Mountains. It is the highest point in San Miguel County, and the third highest point of the Wilson massif, which includes nearby Mount Wilson and El Diente Peak.

The mountain was named for A.D. Wilson, the chief topographer with the Hayden Survey. Nearby Mount Wilson also honors him. The original indigenous name for the mountain was Shandoka, which translates to "Storm Maker", a reference to the peak's effect on local weather patterns.

== Geography ==
Wilson Peak is in the western part of the San Juan Mountains. The western San Juans are also known as the San Miguel Mountains or the Wilson Massif. Two additional fourteen thousand foot peaks are within 2 miles (3 km) of its summit: Mount Wilson (14,256 feet [4,345 m]) and El Diente Peak (14,159 feet [4,316 m]). Gladstone Peak (13,913 feet [4,241 m]) is located on the ridge between Wilson Peak and Mount Wilson.

== Recreation ==
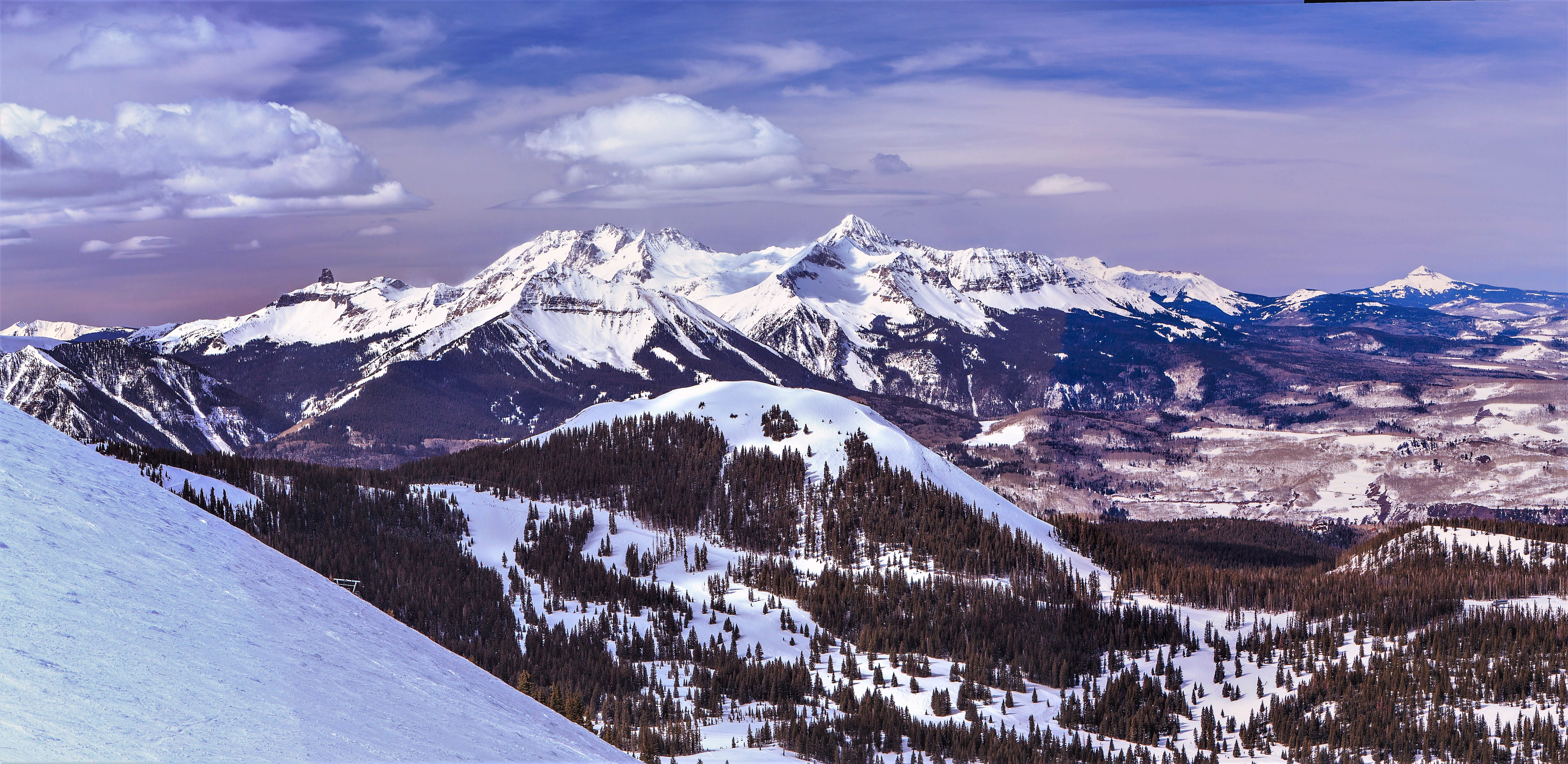
Wilson peak (right of center) photographed from the Telluride Ski Resort

Wilson Peak is climbed by hundreds each year, primarily in summer months, but winter ascents are not unusual and sometimes serve as the beginning of backcountry skiing descents. Summer ascents of the peak are considered Class 3 technical climbs, meaning that scrambling over rock is required (with hand holds being used for balance) and ropes typically not employed.

The easiest route begins at the Rock of Ages Trailhead (elevation 10,350 feet [3,150 m]) located 18 miles (29 km) west of Telluride, Colorado. Forest Trail 429 climbs southeast through Silver Pick Basin to the Rock of Ages Saddle (between Silver Pick and Navajo Basins) at 13,100 feet (3,990 m). Forest Trail 408 is then followed east to 13,200 feet (4,020 m) on the saddle between Gladstone and Wilson Peaks before the ridge is climbed northeast to the summit. Round trip distance is 10 miles (16 km).

=== Access issues ===
Access to Wilson Peak has historically been difficult and intermittent due land ownership issues and the presence of historical mining claims across the mountain. Texas property developer Rusty Nichols owns a 300-acre parcel of land on the mountain and in 2005 barred access to his land and blocked the only non-technical route to the summit. In 2004 and 2006 hikers were charged $100 to climb the mountain.

In 2007, the Trust for Public Land announced they had secured access to Wilson Peak for the public after purchasing 230 acres of land from Nichols. Despite this, access issues to the peak remained. In 2009, Nichols reportedly threatened climbers who were returning from the summit on Wilson Peak with trespassing charges or alternatively, to issue a mea culpa by means of an advertisement in the local newspaper.

In 2011, the peak was reportedly open again. In 2015, access to the mountain was reportedly secured for the public.

=== Incidents ===
Despite its popularity, hikers to Wilson Peak should exercise caution when navigating trails.

In September 2006, a small plane carrying three passengers and a pilot crashed into Wilson Peak, killing all on board.

In September 2024, 53-year old experienced hiker Herbert Wise was fatally injured when he fell 300–400 feet from Wilson Peak's Rock of Ages trail.

== In popular culture ==
The stately and classically mountainous profile of Wilson Peak as viewed from the East and North has led to its use as a symbol of rugged mountains in advertising. Wilson Peak features prominently in many television advertisements for Coors Brewing Company, located in Golden, Colorado. The Jeep automobile corporation also often uses Wilson Peak as a backdrop in its television commercials, particularly in advertisements for its off-road models.

Because of its proximity to Telluride, Colorado, many local companies and festivals use images of Wilson Peak in the advertising to convey the beauty and mountainous nature of the area.

Wilson Peak is featured prominently in Quentin Tarantino's movie The Hateful Eight.

== See also ==
- List of mountain peaks of Colorado
- List of Colorado county high points
- List of Colorado fourteeners
