= Gladstone Peak =

Mountain in the state of Colorado

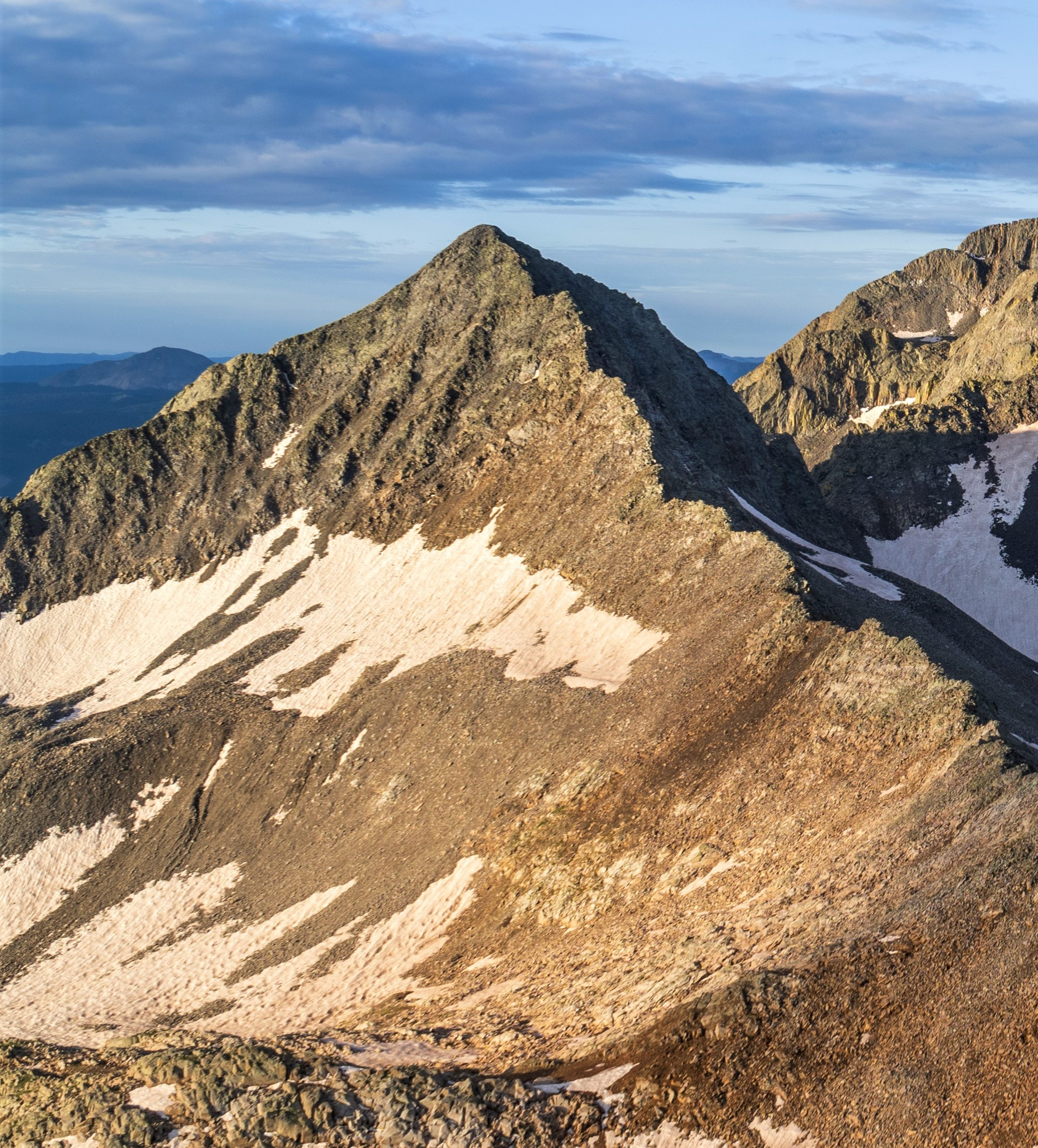
- North aspect

Highest point
- Elevation: 13,919 ft (4,243 m)
- Prominence: 713 ft (217 m)
- Isolation: 0.59 mi (0.95 km)
- Coordinates: 37°50′43″N 107°59′02″W

Geography
- Location within Colorado
- Location: Dolores and San Miguel counties, Colorado, United States
- Parent range: San Miguel Mountains
- Topo map(s): USGS 7.5' topographic map Mount Wilson, Colorado

Gladstone Peak is a high mountain summit in the San Miguel Mountains range of the Rocky Mountains of North America. The 13,919-foot (4,243 m) thirteener is located in the Lizard Head Wilderness, 11.2 miles (18.0 km) southwest by west (bearing 234°) of the Town of Telluride, Colorado, United States, on the drainage divide separating San Juan National Forest and Dolores County from Uncompahgre National Forest and San Miguel County. The mountain was named in honor of British Prime Minister William Gladstone.

== Climate ==
According to the Köppen climate classification system, the mountain is located in an alpine subarctic climate zone with cold, snowy winters, and cool to warm summers. Due to its altitude, it receives precipitation all year, as snow in winter, and as thunderstorms in summer, with a dry period in late spring.

== See also ==
- List of Colorado mountain ranges
- List of Colorado mountain summits
  - List of Colorado fourteeners
  - List of Colorado 4000 meter prominent summits
  - List of the most prominent summits of Colorado
- List of Colorado county high points
