= Lizard Head Wilderness =

Wilderness area in Colorado, United States

- IUCN category Ib (wilderness area)
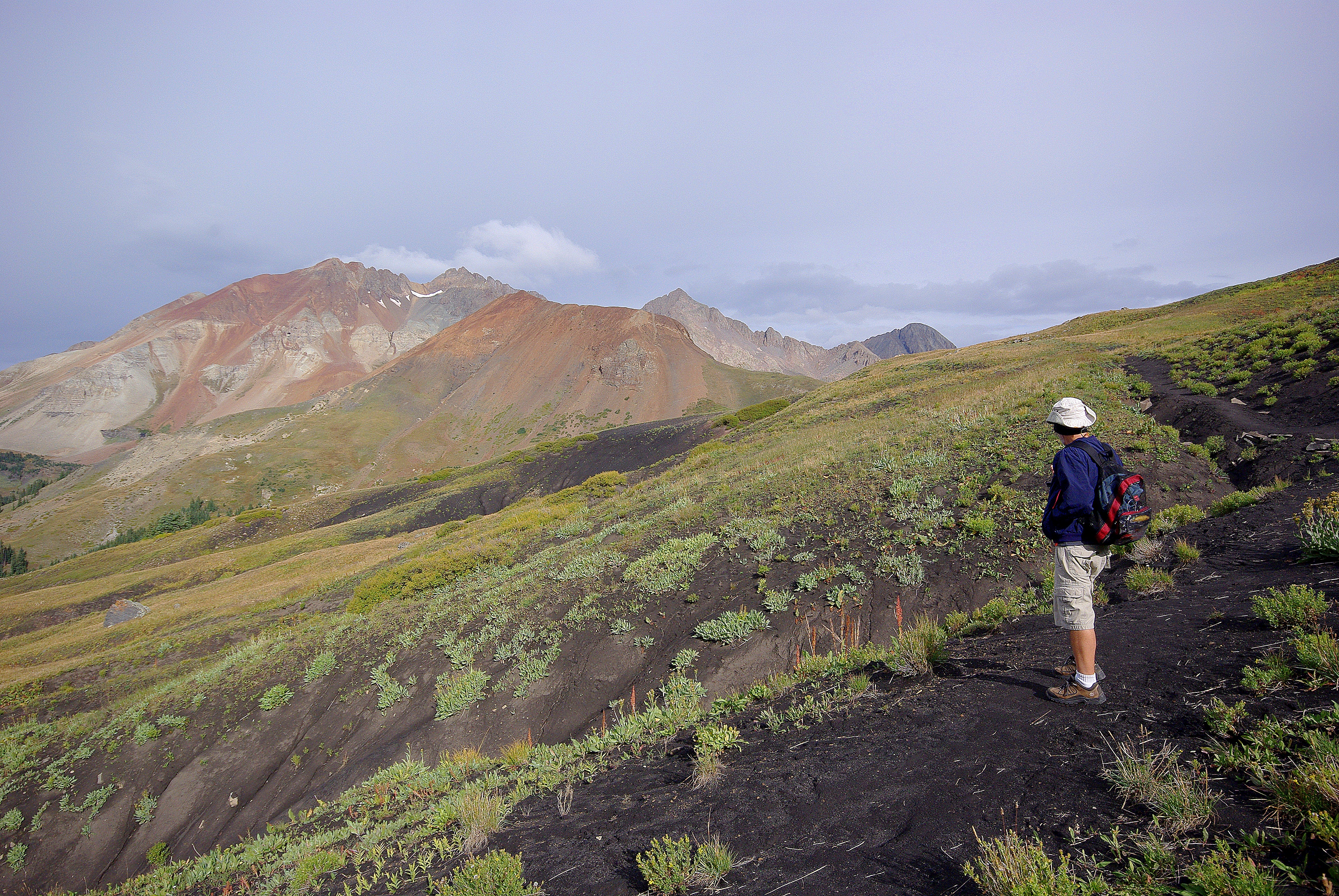
- Cross Mountain, Lizard Head Wilderness

- Location within the United States
- Location: Dolores / San Miguel counties, Colorado, USA
- Nearest city: Telluride, CO
- Coordinates: 37°50′1″N 108°0′49″W
- Area: 41,309 acres (167.17 km^{2})
- Established: January 1, 1980
- Governing body: U.S. Forest Service

The Lizard Head Wilderness is a wilderness area in southwest Colorado. It contains 41,309 acres (167.17 km^{2}) and is jointly managed by the Uncompahgre and San Juan National Forests. It is 10 miles (16 km) southwest of the town of Telluride and is named for a prominent rock formation that is said to look like a lizard's head. Lizard Head itself is 13,113 feet (3,997 m) and is a volcanic spire of crumbling rock. Due to the steepness of the cliffs and the poor quality of the rock for fixing ropes, only experienced mountaineers should attempt to summit the spire. Another 37 miles (60 km) of trails in this infrequently visited wilderness, are also strenuous and should be attempted by more advanced backpackers.

The area includes three prominent fourteeners: El Diente Peak (14,159 feet (4,316 m)), Wilson Peak (14,017 feet (4,272 m)), and Mount Wilson (14,246 feet (4,342 m)). The area includes the headwaters of the west fork of the Dolores River.

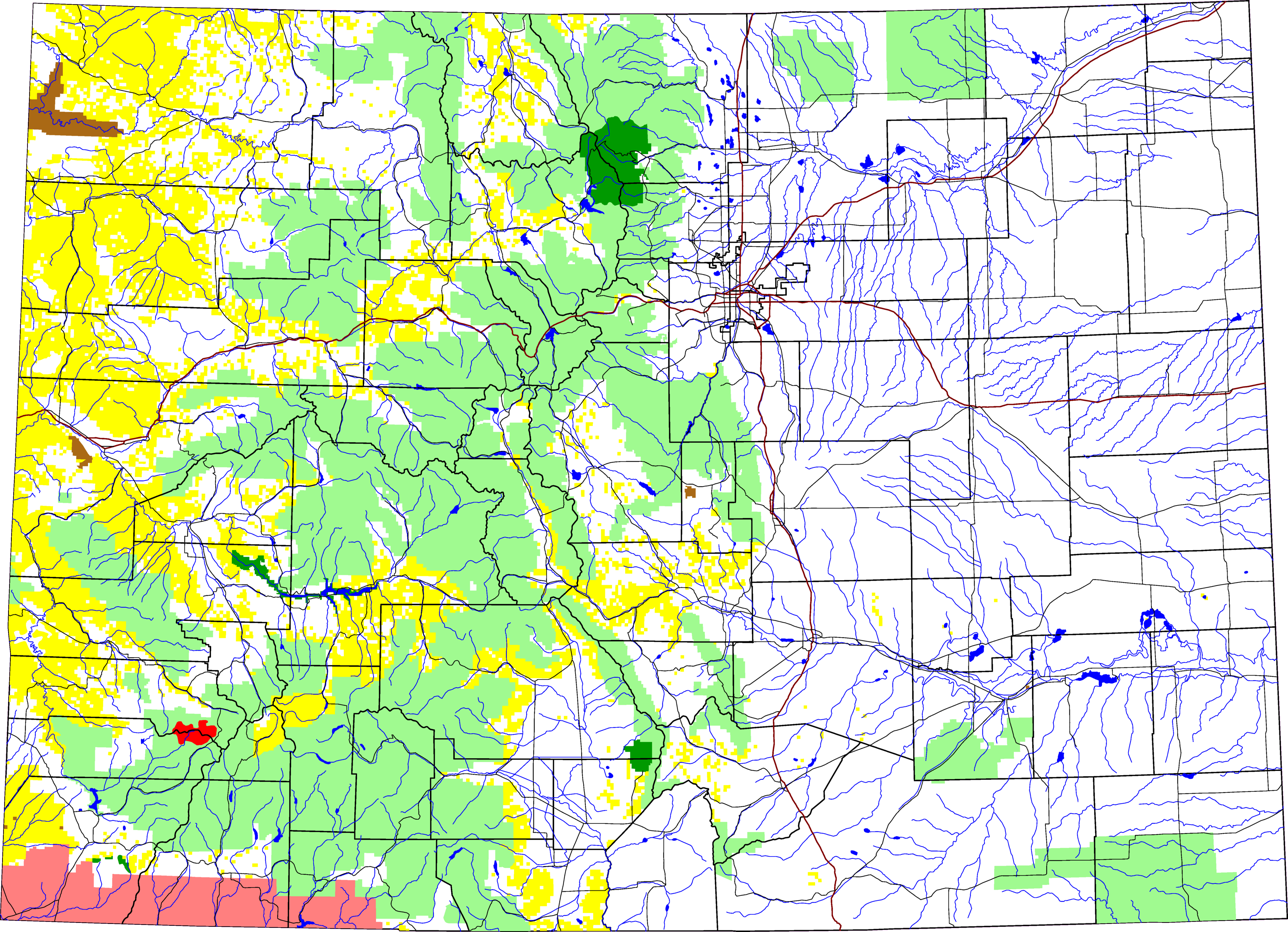
Colorado with Lizard Head Wilderness in red
