= Dolores County, Colorado =

County in Colorado, United States

- County
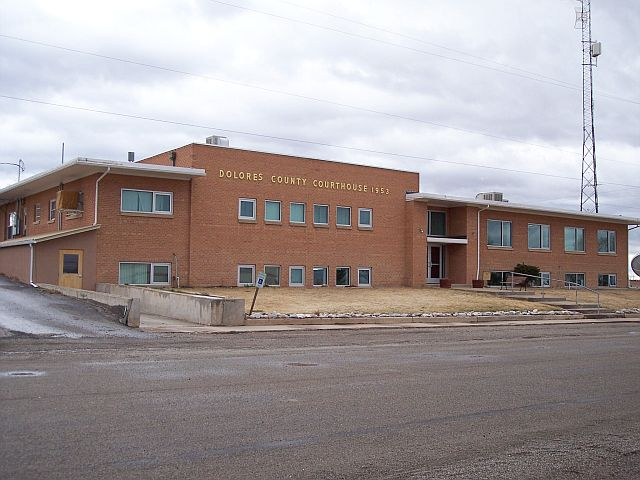
- Dolores County Courthouse in Dove Creek

- Seal

- Location within the U.S. state of Colorado
- Coordinates: 37.75°N 108.52°W
- Country: United States
- State: Colorado
- Founded: February 19, 1881
- Named for: Dolores River
- Seat: Dove Creek
- Largest town: Dove Creek

Area
  - Total: 1,068 sq mi (2,770 km^{2})
  - Land: 1,067 sq mi (2,760 km^{2})
  - Water: 1.0 sq mi (2.6 km^{2}) 0.1%

Population (2020)
  - Total: 2,326
  - Estimate (2025): 2,466 ▲
  - Density: 2.180/sq mi (0.8417/km^{2})
- Time zone: UTC−7 (Mountain)
  - Summer (DST): UTC−6 (MDT)
- Congressional district: 3rd
- Website: dolocnty.colorado.gov

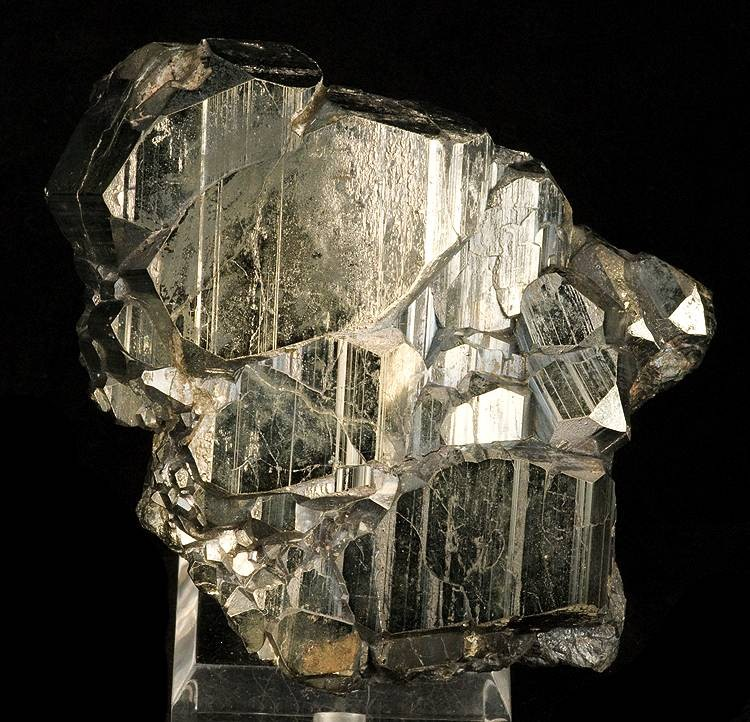
"Bravoite", pyrite with a thin coating of molybdenite, from the Rico Argentine Mine.

Dolores County is a county located in the U.S. state of Colorado. As of the 2020 census, the population was 2,326. The county seat is Dove Creek.

== History ==
It is thought that the area has been the site of human habitation since at least 2500 B.C. Dolores County's western portions were densely populated between 900 and 1300 AD. Population estimates of as many as 10,000 inhabitants, with villages containing hundreds of rooms, have been discovered by archaeologists and other researchers. But this population was destroyed or migrated elsewhere, apparently following a drought and severe societal upheaval in the 14th century, and for centuries thereafter, both the western and eastern mountainous areas of the county were occupied mostly by nomads, including the Ute and the Navajo Indians. Like much of southwestern Colorado, Dolores County is rich in Indian ruins and sites of the Anasazi. According to the Anasazi Heritage Center, Dolores County contains at least 816 recorded archaeological sites as of 1989, with many more inventoried since that time.

The county also contains a portion of a site of regional historic interest, the Dominguez-Escalante Trail of 1776. The trail marks a historic 1,800-mile (2,900 km) trip, intended to discover an overland route between Santa Fe, New Mexico and Monterey, California. The Expedition camped on Dove Creek in the western portion of the county. The Old Spanish Trail later passed through the western portion of the county.

Anglo trappers worked the mountains of eastern Dolores County as early as 1832–33, and gold was discovered in the County in 1866. But it was not until the area was taken from the Ute and removed from the Ute Reservation by the Brunot Agreement of 1878 that large-scale minerals exploration and mining began in the county, although the Pioneer Mining District was established in 1876 in the Rico area. The development of the area was spurred by the discovery of large silver deposits near Rico in 1879, and the Rio Grande Southern Railroad was constructed through the county to connect Durango, Telluride, and Ridgway in 1890-92 The RGS served the eastern end of Dolores County until 1952 when it was abandoned. (The western portion of the county has never had railroad service.)

Rico's high point was in 1892, when the mining district population was more than 5,000; three times the current population of the entire county. The 1893 Silver Panic hit the town hard; by 1900 the population was 811. The mountainous area of Dolores County went through a series of booms and busts through the 20th Century. The low point of the community came in 1974 with an estimated population of 45; since then the town has become a bedroom community for Telluride and has limited tourism and subdivisions; the population has rebounded to almost 300. Efforts are underway in the early 21st Century to again begin major mining activities in the region.

Dove Creek was a way station on the Old Spanish Trail from the mid 19th century, for caravans and travelers moving between Santa Fe, Salt Lake City, and northern California and Nevada. The western portion of the county was used, beginning in the 1870s, for cattle ranching, but the lush grass soon suffered from overgrazing and then fire suppression, allowing the massive expansion of sagebrush, pinyon, and juniper. Homesteading in the area became common beginning in 1914, and dryland farming expanded throughout the Great Sage Plain. Today dryland farming of pinto beans and winter wheat is still a mainstay of the county's economy. But the development of irrigation using water from the Dolores Project in the 1980s, with the construction of McPhee Reservoir (immediately upstream in Montezuma County), has changed the history and population of the county.

Dolores County was created by the Colorado legislature on February 19, 1881, from the western portions of Ouray County, and was named for the Dolores River, which heads up in the county and passes through the county in the Dolores Canyon. The complete Spanish name was Rio de Nuestra Señora de los Dolores (River of our Lady of Sorrows), as reported by Father Silvestre Vélez de Escalante in 1776. Originally set in Rico, the first county courthouse was a 23x48 foot two storage log cabin, but was replaced by a stone and brick courthouse completed in 1883. the county seat was moved to Dove Creek in 1946, and the current courthouse built in 1957. (The original county courthouse in Rico is now the town hall and a branch of the public library.)

In 2009, Dolores County achieved notoriety as the most economically depressed county in Colorado.

== Geography ==
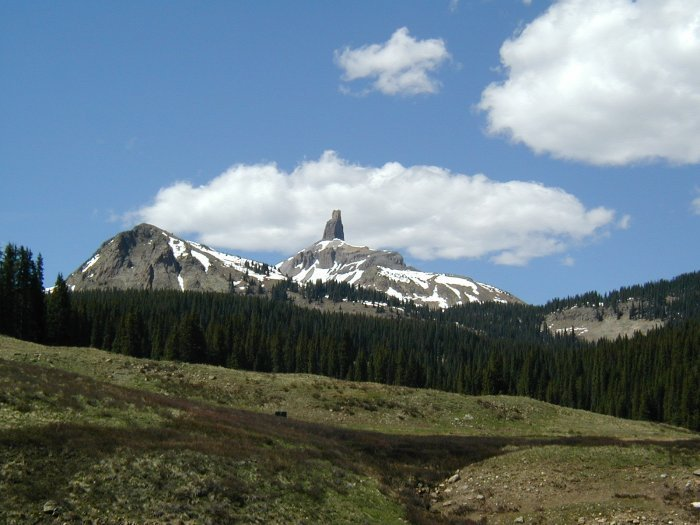
Lizard Head

According to the U.S. Census Bureau, the county has a total area of 1,068 square miles (2,770 km^{2}), of which 1,067 square miles (2,760 km^{2}) is land and 1.0 square mile (2.6 km^{2}) (0.1%) is water.

Dolores County, like other counties in Colorado along its border with Utah, is split into two geographically distinct regions, and in fact, under normal travel conditions, it is necessary to leave the county to travel between the two regions. The western portion of the county (east of the Dolores River Canyon and along the Utah border) is the northern portion of the Great Sage Plain, relatively low 6,500–7,500 ft (2,000–2,300 m) in elevation and flat (but cut by large canyons, including that of the Dolores River itself), and consists of irrigated and dryland farming areas; it is especially well known for the cultivation of various varieties of beans, including pinto beans and many variety of old Anasazi beans. The central portion of the county has higher open grasslands with forested hills, ravines, and canyons, used for livestock raising. The eastern portion of the county is located in the highest peaks of the San Juan Mountains, around the old mining and modern tourist town of Rico, and except for cattle grazing in the San Juan National Forest, has virtually no agriculture, in part because its elevations range from 9,000 to 14,000 ft (2,700 to 4,300 m). Rico is developing in many ways as a bedroom community for the much wealthier town of Telluride in San Miguel County to the north.

Only 38% of the county is private land, located mostly in two large areas at the extreme western end of the county (dryland and irrigated cropland and towns along US 491) and in the central portion of the county (grazing land), with a few thousand acres in scattered parcels (mostly patented mining claims) in the eastern portion of the county around Rico. Separating this private land, 50% of the county is owned by the US government and administered by the US Forest Service as part of San Juan National Forest. An additional 10% (68,456 acres (277.03 km^{2})) of the county is US government land administered by the Bureau of Land Management, including portions of Canyon of the Ancients National Monument. The state of Colorado owns 2% of the county, primarily used as wildlife areas.

=== Adjacent counties ===
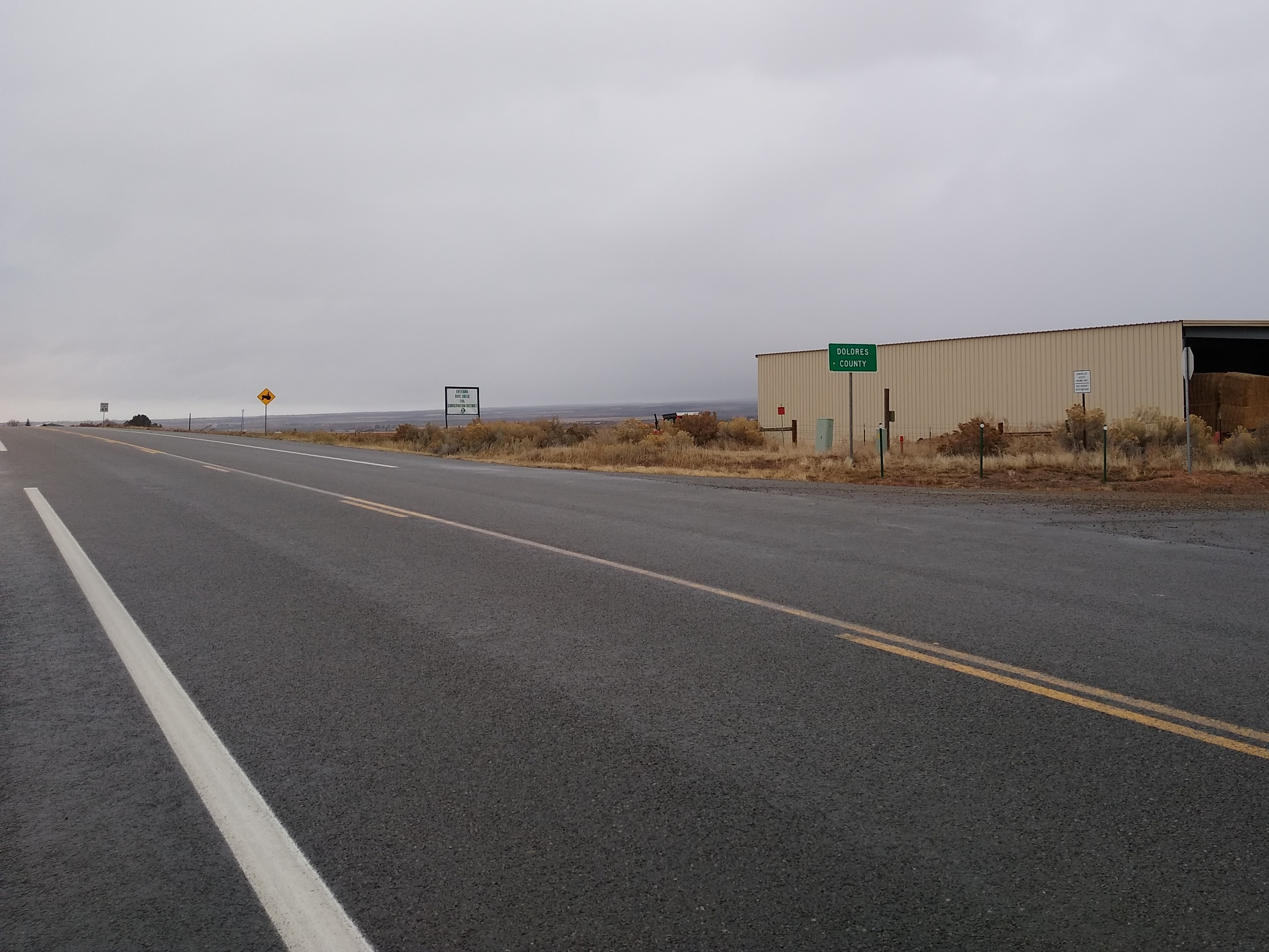
U.S. Route 491 with a sign marking the border between Dolores County and Montezuma County

- San Miguel County, Colorado - north
- San Juan County, Colorado - east
- Montezuma County, Colorado - south
- La Plata County, Colorado - southeast
- San Juan County, Utah - west

=== Major highways ===
- U.S. Highway 491
- State Highway 141
- State Highway 145

== Demographics ==
Historical population
Census	Pop.	Note	%±
1890	1,498		—
1900	1,134		−24.3%
1910	642		−43.4%
1920	1,243		93.6%
1930	1,412		13.6%
1940	1,958		38.7%
1950	1,966		0.4%
1960	2,196		11.7%
1970	1,641		−25.3%
1980	1,658		1.0%
1990	1,504		−9.3%
2000	1,844		22.6%
2010	2,064		11.9%
2020	2,326		12.7%
2025 (est.)	2,466	▲	6.0%
U.S. Decennial Census; 1790-1960 1900-1990; 1990-2000 2010-2020

=== 2020 census ===
As of the 2020 census, the county had a population of 2,326. Of the residents, 17.3% were under the age of 18 and 24.4% were 65 years of age or older; the median age was 49.1 years. For every 100 females there were 106.0 males, and for every 100 females age 18 and over there were 102.5 males. 0.0% of residents lived in urban areas and 100.0% lived in rural areas.

Dolores County, Colorado – Racial and ethnic composition Note: the US Census treats Hispanic/Latino as an ethnic category. This table excludes Latinos from the racial categories and assigns them to a separate category. Hispanics/Latinos may be of any race.
Race / Ethnicity (NH = Non-Hispanic)	Pop 2000	Pop 2010	Pop 2020	% 2000	% 2010	% 2020
White alone (NH)	1,711	1,877	1,950	92.79%	90.94%	83.84%
Black or African American alone (NH)	1	3	18	0.05%	0.15%	0.77%
Native American or Alaska Native alone (NH)	27	55	36	1.46%	2.66%	1.55%
Asian alone (NH)	7	2	6	0.38%	0.10%	0.26%
Pacific Islander alone (NH)	1	2	4	0.05%	0.10%	0.17%
Other race alone (NH)	1	0	5	0.05%	0.00%	0.21%
Mixed race or Multiracial (NH)	25	43	131	1.36%	2.08%	5.63%
Hispanic or Latino (any race)	71	82	176	3.85%	3.97%	7.57%
Total	1,844	2,064	2,326	100.00%	100.00%	100.00%

The racial makeup of the county was 86.9% White, 0.8% Black or African American, 1.8% American Indian and Alaska Native, 0.3% Asian, 0.2% Native Hawaiian and Pacific Islander, 1.5% from some other race, and 8.6% from two or more races. Hispanic or Latino residents of any race comprised 7.6% of the population.

There were 932 households in the county, of which 22.7% had children under the age of 18 living with them and 19.8% had a female householder with no spouse or partner present. About 29.5% of all households were made up of individuals and 14.8% had someone living alone who was 65 years of age or older.

There were 1,319 housing units, of which 29.3% were vacant. Among occupied housing units, 80.0% were owner-occupied and 20.0% were renter-occupied. The homeowner vacancy rate was 2.6% and the rental vacancy rate was 4.1%.

=== 2000 census ===
As of the 2000 census, there were 1,844 people, 785 households, and 541 families residing in the county. The population density was 2 people per square mile (0.77 people/km^{2}). There were 1,193 housing units at an average density of one per square mile (0/km^{2}). The racial makeup of the county was 95.28% White, 0.05% Black or African American, 1.95% Native American, 0.38% Asian, 0.05% Pacific Islander, 0.60% from other races, and 1.68% from two or more races. 3.85% of the population were Hispanic or Latino of any race.

There were 785 households, out of which 24.50% had children under the age of 18 living with them, 57.70% were married couples living together, 8.50% had a female householder with no husband present, and 31.00% were non-families. 26.20% of all households were made up of individuals, and 10.40% had someone living alone who was 65 years of age or older. The average household size was 2.35 and the average family size was 2.82.

In the county, the population was spread out, with 21.90% under the age of 18, 6.80% from 18 to 24, 26.30% from 25 to 44, 27.80% from 45 to 64, and 17.10% who were 65 years of age or older. The median age was 42 years. For every 100 females there were 107.20 males. For every 100 females age 18 and over, there were 104.50 males.

The median income for a household in the county was $32,196, and the median income for a family was $38,000. Males had a median income of $30,972 versus $20,385 for females. The per capita income for the county was $17,106. About 10.20% of families and 13.10% of the population were below the poverty line, including 9.80% of those under age 18 and 18.30% of those age 65 or over.

In the third quarter of 2009, county unemployment was 13.1%, the worst in Colorado, and up from 7.3% in 2008. Average weekly wages were $489. Many residents of the county commute to San Miguel County (Telluride) or Montezuma County (primarily Cortez and rural-area industries and commercial establishments).

== Communities ==
=== Towns ===
- Dove Creek
- Rico

=== Unincorporated communities ===
- Cahone

== Politics ==
In its early history Dolores County favored the Democratic Party. It was one of the few western or northern counties to be won by Alton B. Parker in 1904, and was never won by a Republican until Warren G. Harding carried the county in 1920. In the 1924 election Dolores was the only county in Colorado to give a plurality of its vote to "Fighting Bob" La Follette, but since World War II Dolores has gradually become a powerfully Republican county. The last Democrat to win a majority in Dolores County has been Lyndon Johnson in his 1964 landslide, and although Jimmy Carter obtained a plurality in 1976, no subsequent Democratic presidential nominee has obtained 35 percent of the county's vote.

United States presidential election results for Dolores County, Colorado
Year	Republican		Democratic		Third party(ies)	
Year	No.	%	No.	%	No.	%
1884	191	55.69%	152	44.31%	0	0.00%
1888	140	57.61%	103	42.39%	0	0.00%
1892	294	32.92%	0	0.00%	599	67.08%
1896	11	1.60%	676	98.11%	2	0.29%
1900	66	13.55%	412	84.60%	9	1.85%
1904	150	44.78%	167	49.85%	18	5.37%
1908	69	23.23%	184	61.95%	44	14.81%
1912	45	19.48%	124	53.68%	62	26.84%
1916	46	14.07%	251	76.76%	30	9.17%
1920	197	48.28%	153	37.50%	58	14.22%
1924	95	21.30%	157	35.20%	194	43.50%
1928	387	55.92%	278	40.17%	27	3.90%
1932	183	26.48%	464	67.15%	44	6.37%
1936	225	38.66%	323	55.50%	34	5.84%
1940	478	54.75%	379	43.41%	16	1.83%
1944	429	58.85%	300	41.15%	0	0.00%
1948	352	43.95%	435	54.31%	14	1.75%
1952	542	62.23%	323	37.08%	6	0.69%
1956	544	60.38%	354	39.29%	3	0.33%
1960	476	55.22%	386	44.78%	0	0.00%
1964	322	39.36%	496	60.64%	0	0.00%
1968	392	52.97%	217	29.32%	131	17.70%
1972	498	71.76%	166	23.92%	30	4.32%
1976	343	45.61%	374	49.73%	35	4.65%
1980	615	75.28%	157	19.22%	45	5.51%
1984	667	78.47%	173	20.35%	10	1.18%
1988	488	66.67%	230	31.42%	14	1.91%
1992	315	37.23%	242	28.61%	289	34.16%
1996	417	51.67%	276	34.20%	114	14.13%
2000	741	65.34%	293	25.84%	100	8.82%
2004	785	68.44%	333	29.03%	29	2.53%
2008	818	67.21%	369	30.32%	30	2.47%
2012	859	69.00%	334	26.83%	52	4.18%
2016	944	75.22%	242	19.28%	69	5.50%
2020	1,089	75.16%	341	23.53%	19	1.31%
2024	1,076	75.83%	325	22.90%	18	1.27%

United States Senate election results for Dolores County, Colorado2
Year	Republican		Democratic		Third party(ies)	
Year	No.	%	No.	%	No.	%
2020	1,064	74.56%	338	23.69%	25	1.75%

United States Senate election results for Dolores County, Colorado3
Year	Republican		Democratic		Third party(ies)	
Year	No.	%	No.	%	No.	%
2022	873	67.94%	353	27.47%	59	4.59%

Colorado Gubernatorial election results for Dolores County
Year	Republican		Democratic		Third party(ies)	
Year	No.	%	No.	%	No.	%
2022	806	62.05%	348	26.79%	145	11.16%

In gubernatorial elections, Dolores County is also Republican-leaning: in 2010 it was along with neighboring Montezuma County one of only two counties to give a plurality to Dan Maes The last Democratic gubernatorial candidate to win Dolores County was Bill Ritter in 2006, whilst Roy Romer carried the county twice in 1986 and 1990.

== National protected areas ==
- Calico National Recreation Trail
- Canyons of the Ancients National Monument (part)
- Lizard Head Wilderness
- Old Spanish National Historic Trail
- San Juan National Forest

== Transportation ==
With the Rio Grande Southern Railroad ceasing operation in 1952, Dolores County has no railroads operating today. The western third of the county is served by US 491 (formerly US 666) connecting to Cortez, CO, and Monticello, UT; and SH 141 to Nucla, CO. The eastern portion of the county is served by SH 145 connecting to Dolores, CO, and Telluride, CO. The central portion of the county is served by the joint County-USFS Norwood Road connecting to Dolores, CO, and Norwood, CO (in San Miquel County). The three portions of the county are connected directly to each other only by gravel-surface, low-speed county or federal agency roads.

The only airport is the privately owned Dove Creek Airport east of Dove Creek; a general aviation facility with a 4,000-foot (1,200 m) runway. The nearest commercial service is located at Cortez Municipal Airport to the south, and San Juan (UT) County Airport north of Monticello.

=== Bicycle routes ===
- Great Parks Bicycle Route
- Western Express Bicycle Route

=== Scenic byway ===
- San Juan Skyway National Scenic Byway

== Education ==
The county is entirely in the Dolores County School District RE-2, which also extends beyond the county.

== See also ==
- Bibliography of Colorado
- Geography of Colorado
- History of Colorado
  - National Register of Historic Places listings in Dolores County, Colorado
- Index of Colorado-related articles
- List of Colorado-related lists
  - List of counties in Colorado
- Outline of Colorado
