= San Juan National Forest =

National Forest in western Colorado

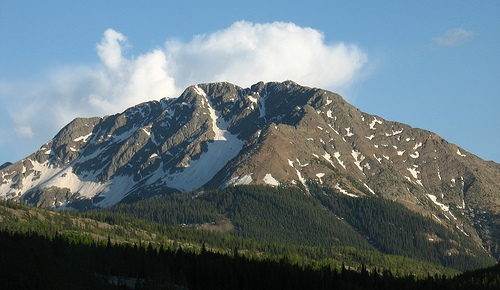

- Location within the United States
- Location: Colorado, United States
- Nearest city: Durango, Colorado
- Coordinates: 37°33′19″N 107°40′18″W
- Area: 1,878,846 acres (7,603.42 km^{2})
- Established: June 3, 1905
- Governing body: U.S. Forest Service
- Website: San Juan National Forest

The San Juan National Forest is a U.S. national forest covering over 1,878,846 acres (2,935.7 sq mi, or 7,603.42 km²) in western Colorado. The forest occupies land in Archuleta, Conejos, Dolores, Hinsdale, La Plata, Mineral, Montezuma, Rio Grande, San Miguel and San Juan Counties. It borders the Uncompahgre National Forest to the north and the Rio Grande National Forest to the east. The forest covers most of the southern portion of the San Juan Mountains west of the Continental Divide. The forest contains two alpine wilderness areas; the Weminuche and South San Juan, as well as the Piedra Area. The Durango and Silverton Narrow Gauge Railroad passes through the National Forest.

The name of the forest comes from the San Juan River, which was originally called the Rio San Juan, after Saint John the Baptist (San Juan Bautista in Spanish).

== History ==
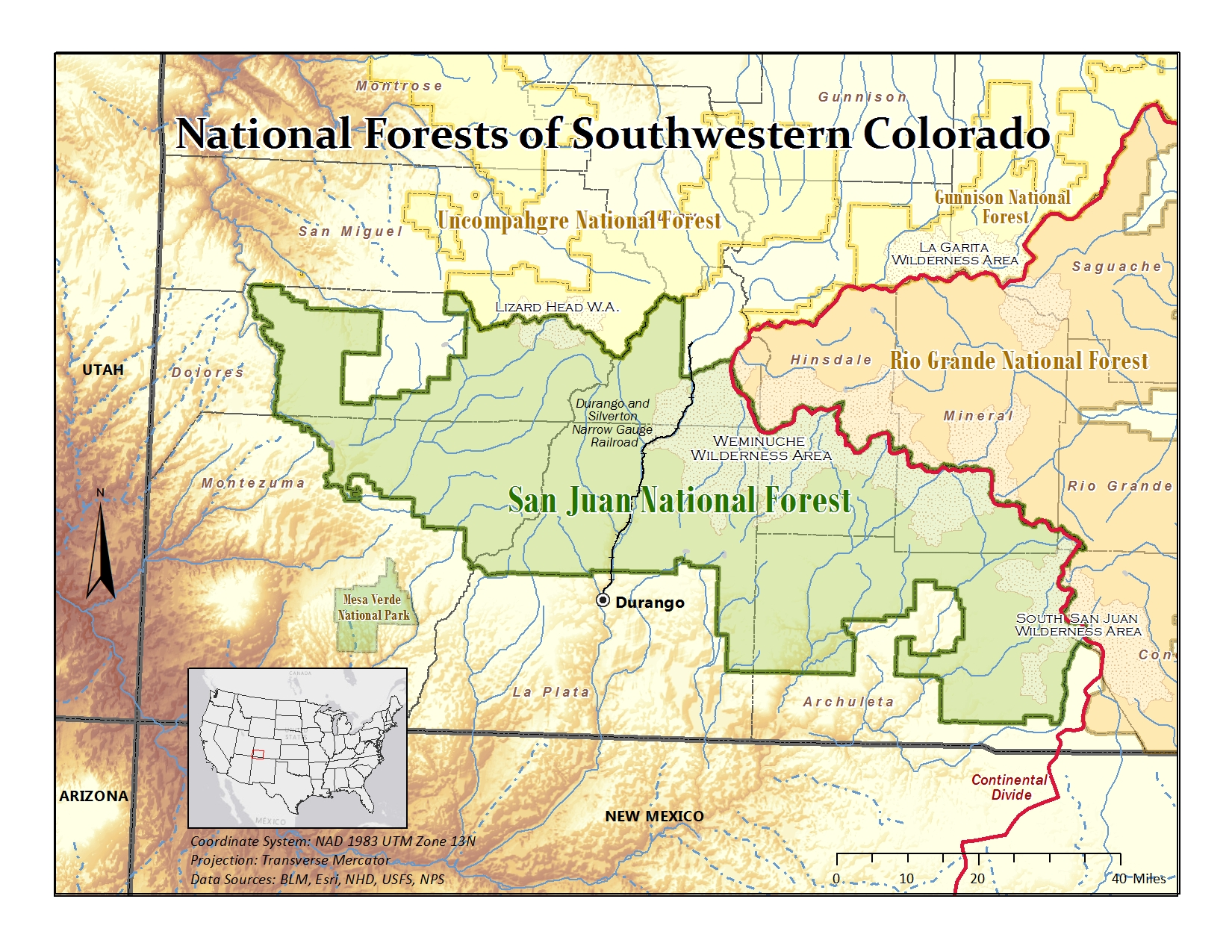
San Juan National Forest

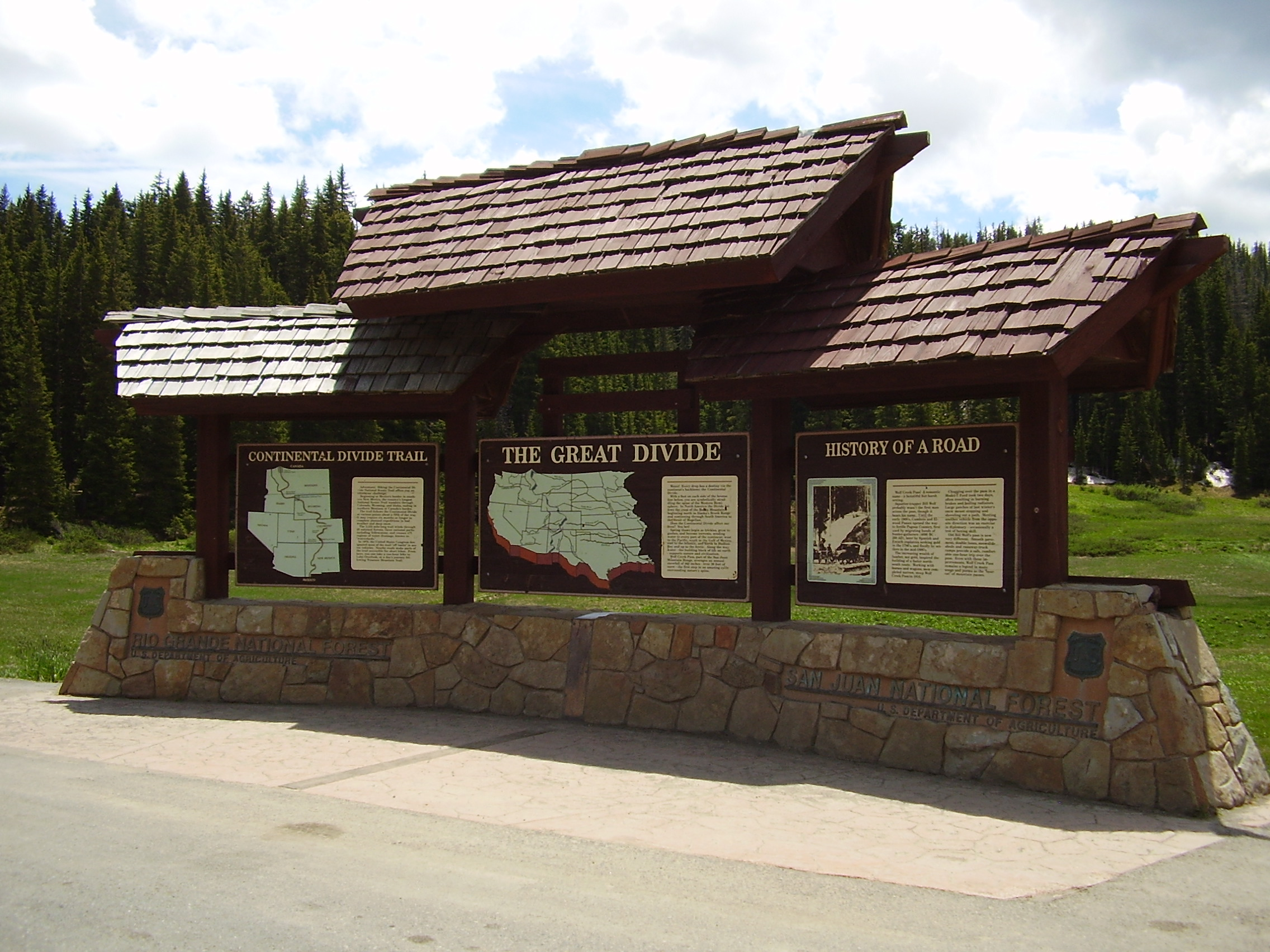
The Continental Divide of the Americas separates the San Juan National Forest and the Rio Grande National Forest

Theodore Roosevelt created the forest by proclamation on June 3, 1905. Forest headquarters are located in Durango, Colorado. There are local ranger district offices in Bayfield, Dolores, and Pagosa Springs. President Barack Obama designated part of the forest as Chimney Rock National Monument by proclamation on September 21, 2012.

== Wilderness areas ==
There are four officially designated wilderness areas lying within San Juan National Forest that are part of the National Wilderness Preservation System. Three of them extend partially into neighboring National Forests (as indicated).

- Lizard Head Wilderness (partly in Uncompahgre NF)
- South San Juan Wilderness (mostly in Rio Grande NF)
- Weminuche Wilderness (partly in Rio Grande NF)
- Hermosa Creek Wilderness (all on San Juan National Forest)

== See also ==
- 416 Fire
- List of national forests of the United States
