= Utah State Route 46 =

State highway in Grand County, Utah, United States

State Route 46

Route information
- Maintained by UDOT
- Length: 21.6124 mi (34.7818 km)
- History: 1915: as a state highway; 1927: as SR 46

Major junctions
- West end: US 191 at La Sal Junction
- East end: SH 90 west of Paradox, CO

Location
- Country: United States
- State: Utah

Highway system
- Utah State Highway System; Interstate; US; State; Minor; Scenic
← SR-45	→ SR-48

State Route 46 (SR-46) is a 21.6124-mile (34.7818 km) state highway in northern San Juan County, Utah, United States, that connects U.S. Route 191 (US 191) at La Sal Junction (west of La Sal) with Colorado State Highway 90 (CO 90) in Colorado (west of Bedrock). It is the only major roadway that connects Utah with Colorado between Interstate 70 / U.S. Route 6 / U.S. Route 50 (I-70 / US 6 / US 50) to the north and U.S. Route 491 to the south.

== Route description ==
SR-46 begins at La Sal Junction, a T intersection with US 191 about 22 miles (35 km) south of Moab in northeastern San Juan County, Utah. (US 191 heads north from the junction toward Moab and I-70 / US 6 / US 50. US 191 heads south toward Monticello and Blanding.) From its western terminus SR-46 heads easterly for about 2.2 miles (3.5 km) before entering the census-designated place (CDP) of La Sal. Approximately 9.3 miles (15.0 km) later SR-46 leaves the CDP and passes through roughly 1.74 miles (2.80 km) of the Manti-La Sal National Forest. Just before leaving the National Forest, SR-46 enters the unincorporated community of Old La Sal. About 5 miles (8.0 km) farther east, SR-46 leaves Old La Sal and about 3.3 miles (5.3 km) later it reaches its eastern terminus at the Colorado State line. (The roadway continues east as Colorado State Highway 90 toward Bedrock and Naturita.)

== History ==
The road from State Route 9 (then also U.S. Route 450 (US 450), now US 191) at La Sal Junction east to Colorado was added to the state highway system in 1915, and in 1927 the state legislature numbered it SR-4. In 1939 US 450 was added to U.S. Route 160, which in turn was added to U.S. Route 163 (US 163) in 1970. In 1981, the northern end of US 163 was added to US 191.

== Major intersections ==
The entire route is in San Juan County.

Location	mi	km	Destinations	Notes
La Sal Junction	0.0000	0.0000	US 191 north – Moab, I-70 US 191 south – Monticello, Blanding	Western terminus T intersection
	21.6124	34.7818	Colorado State Line	Western terminus
	21.6124	34.7818	SH 90 east – Bedrock, Naturita	Continuation east from eastern terminus
1.000 mi = 1.609 km; 1.000 km = 0.621 mi

== See also ==
- List of state highways in Utah
