= Colorado State Highway 141 =

State highway in Colorado, United States

State Highway 141
- SH 141 highlighted in red

Route information
- Maintained by CDOT
- Length: 162.297 mi (261.192 km)

Major junctions
- South end: US 491 near Dove Creek
- SH 145 near Naturita; SH 90 near Naturita; US 50 near Whitewater
- North end: I-70 BL / US 6 at Clifton

Location
- Country: United States
- State: Colorado
- Counties: Dolores, San Miguel, Montrose, Mesa

Highway system
- Colorado State Highway System; Interstate; US; State; Scenic
← SH 140	→ SH 142

State Highway 141 (SH 141) is a 162.297 mi (261.192 km) long state highway in far western Colorado, United States. Though nominally oriented north–south, SH 141 winds around a considerable amount due to the rugged terrain and ultimately forms a giant S shape. SH 141's southern terminus is at U.S. Route 491 (US 491) near Dove Creek, and the northern terminus is at Interstate 70 Business (I-70 Bus.) in Grand Junction. SH 141 is the longest three-digit state highway in Colorado.

== Route description ==
Beginning west of Dove Creek, the highway runs north, then swings east to drop into a canyon and cross the Dolores River at Slick Rock. SH 141 follows the Dolores for a short while, then continues east through Gypsum Gap, then north through Broad Canyon. At a junction with SH 145 the highway turns west through Naturita, then northwest following the San Miguel River to the Dolores River. It continues a winding path northwest along the Dolores to Gateway. There it turns northeast, running through the Unaweep Canyon to the Gunnison River valley where it joins US 50 at Whitewater. The highway heads northwest alongside the Gunnison River, splitting off from US 50 as it nears Grand Junction. It heads north across the Colorado River and ends at a junction with I-70 Bus. east of Grand Junction.

SH 141 between Naturita and Whitewater is part of the Colorado designated Unaweep Tabeguache Scenic Byway.

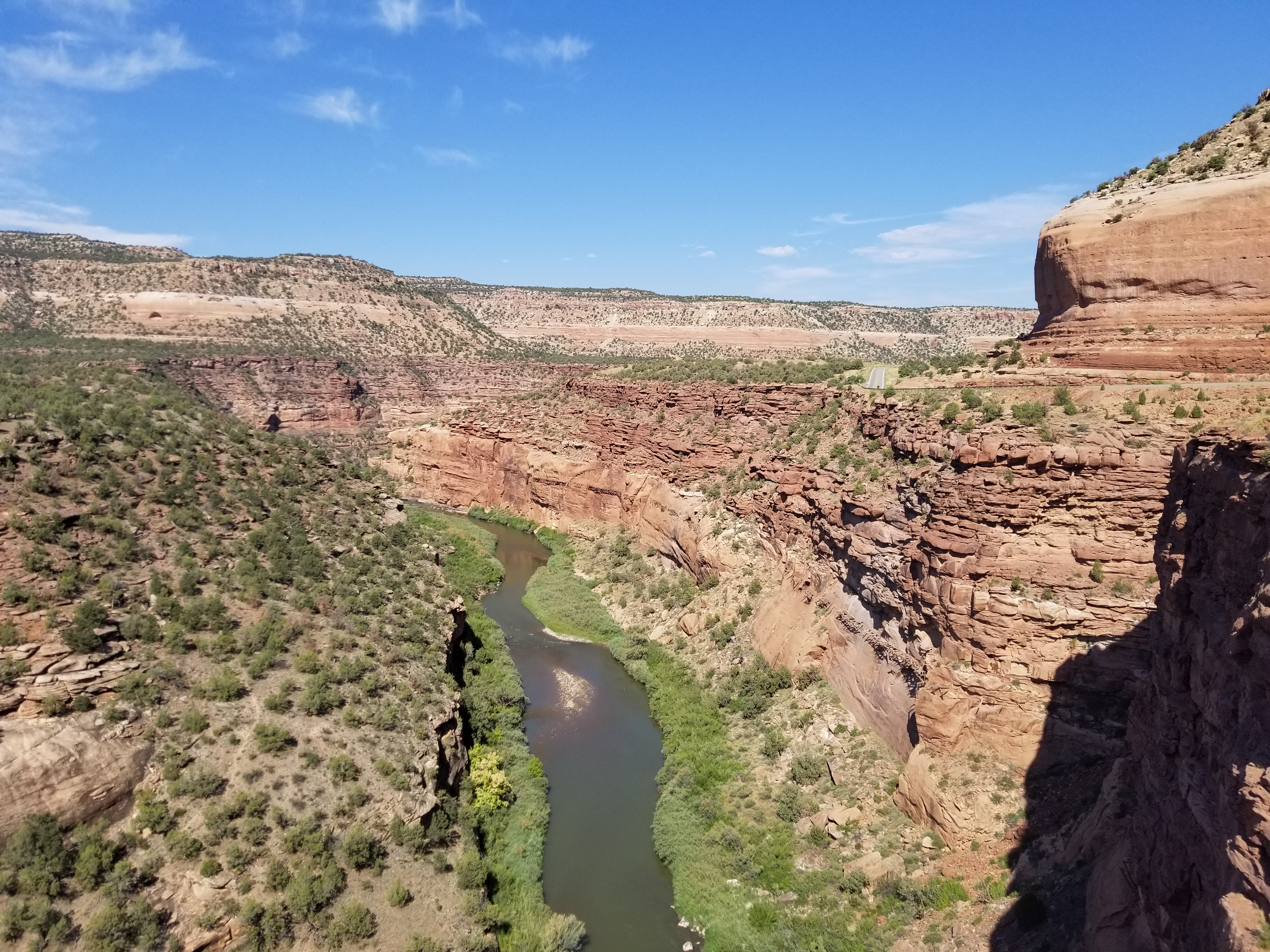
View north at the Hanging Flume overlook on SH 141

== Major intersections ==
County	Location	mi	km	Destinations	Notes
Dolores		0.000	0.000	US 491 – Dove Creek, Monticello	Southern terminus
San Miguel	No major junctions				
Montrose		56.705	91.258	SH 145 south – Norwood	Northern terminus of SH 145
Montrose	Naturita	60.452	97.288	SH 97 north – Nucla	Southern terminus of SH 97
Montrose		62.436	100.481	SH 90 west – Paradox, Moab	Eastern terminus of western segment of SH 90
Mesa	Whitewater	154.109	248.014	US 50 east – Delta	South end of US 50 overlap
Mesa		156.746	252.258	US 50 west – Grand Junction	North end of US 50 overlap
Mesa	Clifton	162.297	261.192	I-70 BL / US 6 – Grand Junction, Palisade	Northern terminus
1.000 mi = 1.609 km; 1.000 km = 0.621 mi: Concurrency terminus
