= Paradox Valley =

Geological formation and placename in the U.S. state of Colorado

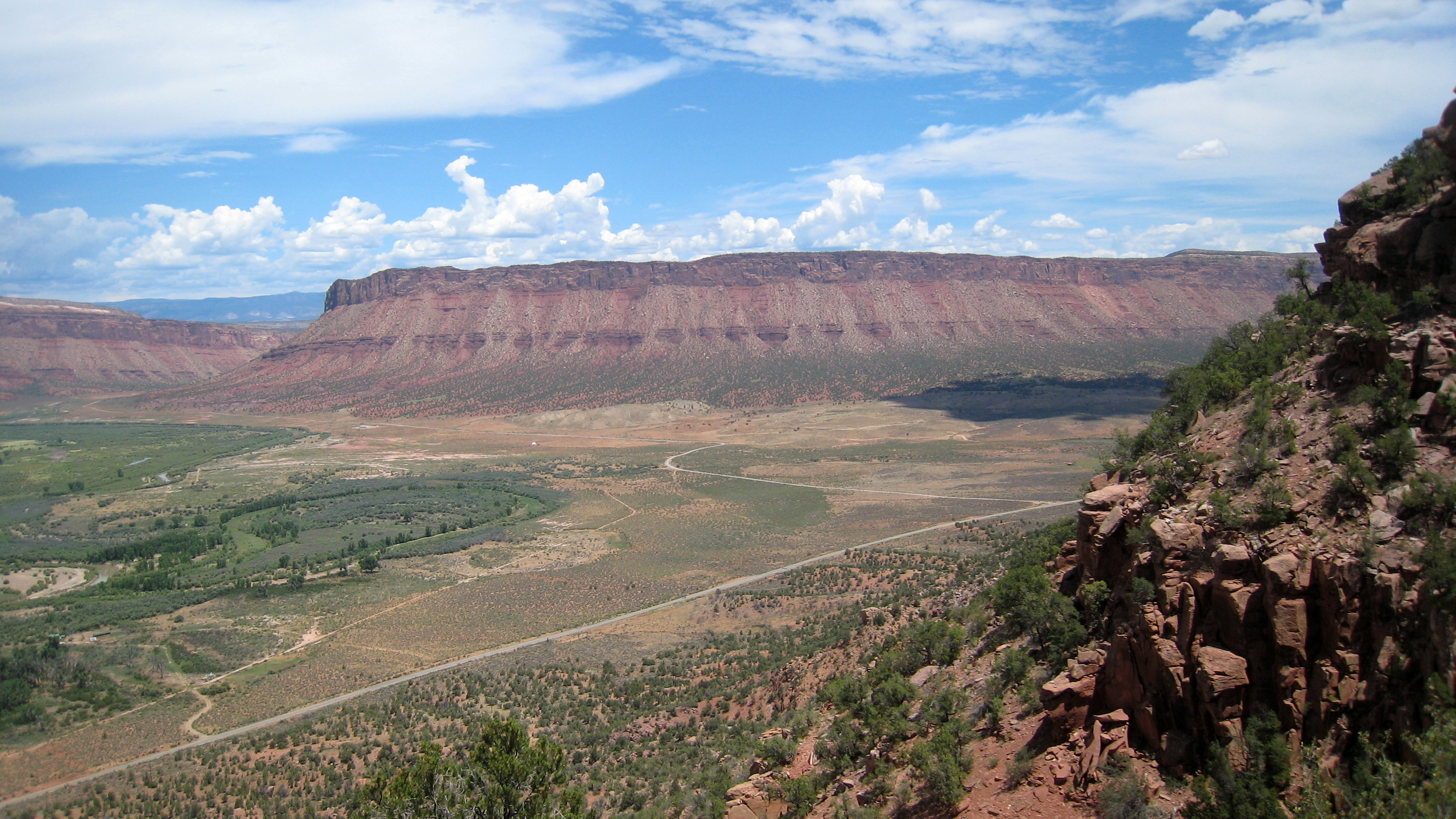
- Paradox Valley as seen from near the southwest rim. The Dolores River is at the left edge.

- Location within Colorado
- Floor elevation: 4,944 ft (1,507 m)
- Length: 25 miles (40 km) NW-SE
- Width: 3 to 5 miles (4.8 to 8.0 km)

Geography
- Location: Montrose County, Colorado, United States
- Coordinates: 38°19′N 108°51′W
- Interactive map of Paradox Valley

Paradox Valley is a depression located in western Montrose County in the U.S. state of Colorado. The dry, sparsely populated valley is named after the apparently paradoxical course of the Dolores River—instead of flowing down the length of the valley, the river cuts across the middle and through the sheer walls of large mesas on either side. The valley is the site of a Bureau of Reclamation salinity-control project which has caused thousands of earthquakes, and is the proposed location of a new uranium mill which would be the first built in the United States in over 25 years.

== Geography and climate ==
Paradox Valley trends northwest-southeast and measures about 3 to 5 miles (5 to 8 km) wide and 25 miles (40 km) long. It lies along the extreme western edge of Colorado, close to the border with Utah, about 50 miles (80 km) south of the city of Grand Junction. The La Sal Range rises just to the northwest in Utah. State Highway 90 follows Paradox Valley on its way from Naturita to the Utah state line, crossing the Dolores River Bridge near the small unincorporated town of Bedrock. The town of Paradox lies a few miles north of the highway. Elevations on the valley floor range from about 5,000 feet (1,500 m) at the Dolores River to nearly 6,000 feet (1,800 m) at the southeast end. Steep parallel sandstone and shale walls bound the valley to the northeast and southwest.

The valley was named in 1875 by geologist and surveyor Albert Charles Peale after he noted that the Dolores River had a "desire to perform strange and unexpected things" in the area. Instead of flowing down the valley's thalweg, the river emerges from a narrow gap in one wall, cuts perpendicularly across the mostly level valley floor, and exits through another gap in the opposite wall. As a consequence of this unusual geography, the valley cannot be easily irrigated by the Dolores River, but springs and streams fed by snowmelt from the La Sal Range support farming in the northwestern third of the valley.

Near the center of the valley, the town of Bedrock experiences average highs ranging from 45 °F (7 °C) in December to 96 °F (36 °C) in July. Average lows range from 13 °F (−11 °C) in December to 54 °F (12 °C) in July. An average of 11 inches (28 cm) of precipitation, including 9 inches (23 cm) of snow, fall annually at Bedrock.

== Geology ==
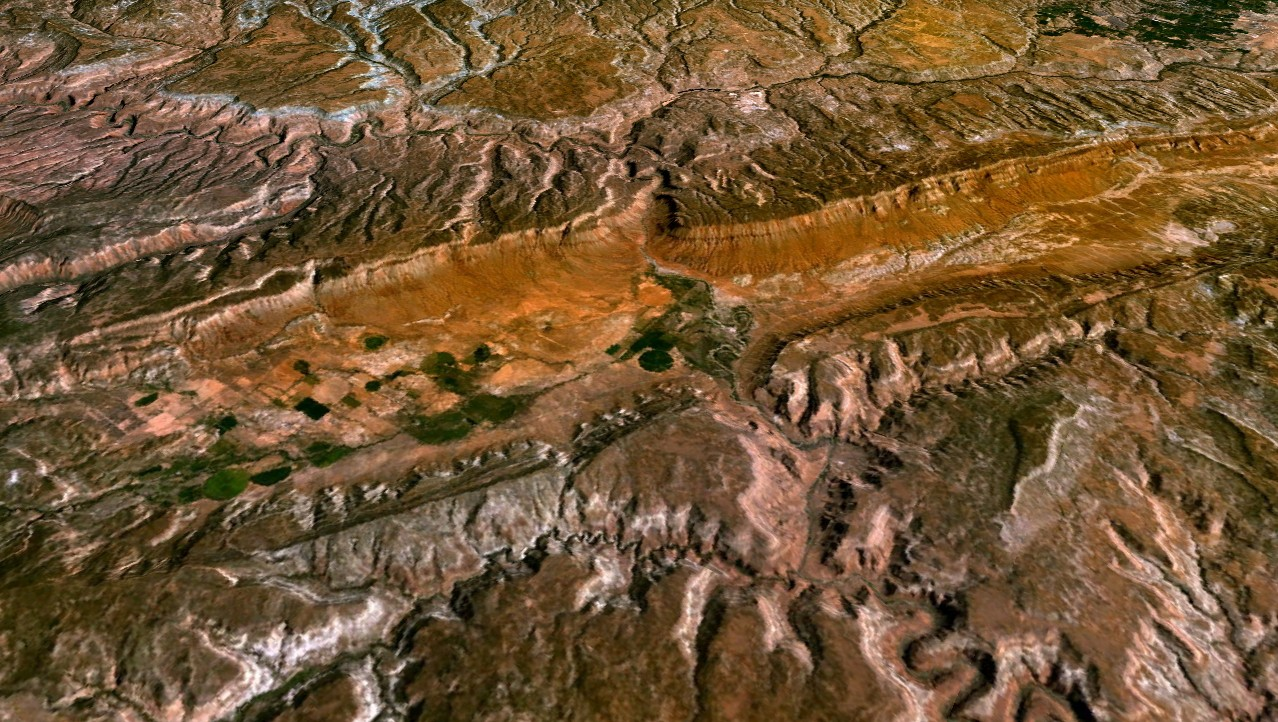
The entrenched Dolores River (lower right to upper left) is seen crossing Paradox Valley (center) in this simulated view

South end of the Paradox Valley

North end of the Paradox Valley

The apparent paradox of Paradox Valley can be explained by salt tectonics. The valley is a collapsed anticline, a type of geological fold. About 300 million years ago, during the middle Pennsylvanian period, when the Dolores River was already in existence, high pressures on lands to the northeast caused underlying salt deposits to flow towards where the valley is today. The salt encountered a buried fault-block ridge and was deflected upwards, penetrating the overlying rock strata and forming a salt dome. The salt may not have actually been exposed on the surface, but groundwater entering the top of the dome dissolved the underlying salt beds, allowing the center to collapse, forming what is today Paradox Valley. This process took place over about 150 million years, a long enough time for the Dolores River to downcut into the land and maintain its ancient course. The same process also created the Moab Valley (Spanish Valley) to the west, itself cut crosswise in a similar fashion by the Colorado River.

The Paradox Formation, a geological formation containing salt, gypsum, anhydrite, shale, sandstone, and limestone, is named after exposures found in Paradox Valley. The Paradox Basin, a geologic province throughout which the Paradox Formation is found, also bears the name of the valley.

== History ==
Paradox Valley was within the historical domain of the Ute tribe. An 1868 treaty created a reservation for the Utes over much of western Colorado, including Paradox Valley. Squatters began grazing cattle in the valley as early as 1877, in violation of the treaty. By 1881, the Utes had been forced out of the area, and in 1882 the United States Congress officially opened the land to settlement. Springs and streams allowed farming in the northwest end of the valley, and the mid-1890s discovery of copper at the future site of the Cashin Mine near the town of Bedrock brought in a further influx of settlers. The valley and the surrounding plateau soon also became an important source of radioactive materials, including radium and uranium. In 1913, The New York Times identified carnotite mines near Paradox Valley as the source of "the greatest radium ore deposits in the world". Production of radium ceased in 1922 when richer deposits were found in the Belgian Congo, but production of uranium and vanadium continued throughout most of the century.

== Paradox Valley Unit ==
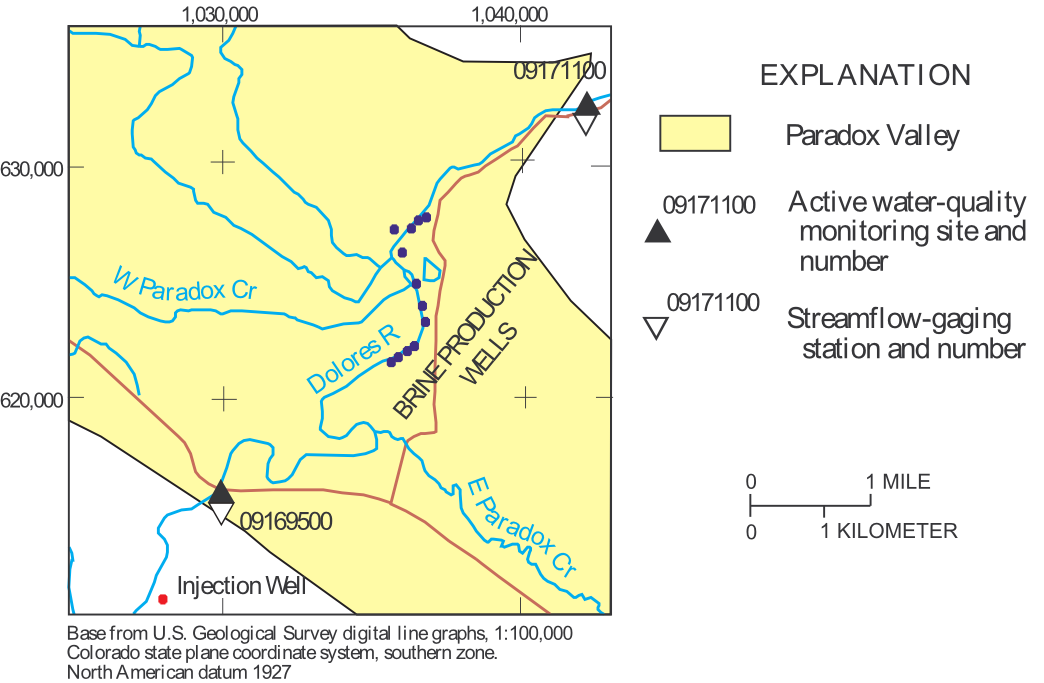
Location of the injection well, brine production wells, and gauging stations

Near-surface salt beds up to 14,000 feet (4,300 m) thick still underlie Paradox Valley. The Dolores River, a tributary of the Colorado River, naturally picks up about 100,000-200,000 tons of salt annually on its way through the valley. In the 1980s, the United States Bureau of Reclamation began construction of a pumping facility known as the Paradox Valley Unit. The PVU, a part of the wider Colorado River Basin Salinity Control Project, became fully operational in 1996 and collects saline groundwater from 12 shallow wells along the Dolores River. The system then dilutes the brine with water and a corrosion inhibitor and transports it to a high-pressure injection well, where it is deposited 14,000 to 16,000 feet (4,300 to 4,900 m) deep into Precambrian and Paleozoic rocks. A 2001 study found that the total salt reaching the Dolores had declined by about 90%, although this may have been the result of a period of low precipitation during the measurement period. As of 2009, the PVU removes about 113,000 tons of salt annually from Paradox Valley.

The injection well of the Paradox Valley Unit has induced thousands of earthquakes, including at least 4,000 prior to the year 2001. Most were below the threshold of human detection, but at least 15 have been over 2.5 in magnitude, the largest being a 4.3 magnitude quake on May 27, 2000. The PVU suspended operations for 28 days following this quake, but later resumed injections at a lower rate. Further earthquakes have been linked with the operation, including a 3.9 magnitude quake in 2004.

== Piñon Ridge Mill ==
In 2009 Energy Fuels Resources Corporation, a subsidiary of Toronto-based Energy Fuels Incorporated, proposed the construction of a uranium mill in the southeast end of Paradox Valley. Called the Piñon Ridge Mill, it would have been capable of processing 500 tons of uranium ore per day. Legal action tied up the project for many years, and as of September 2020 the project appears to have died.

== See also ==
- Paradox basin
- Paradox, Colorado
