= Redvale, Colorado =

Census-designated place in Montrose County, Colorado, United States

- Census-designated place
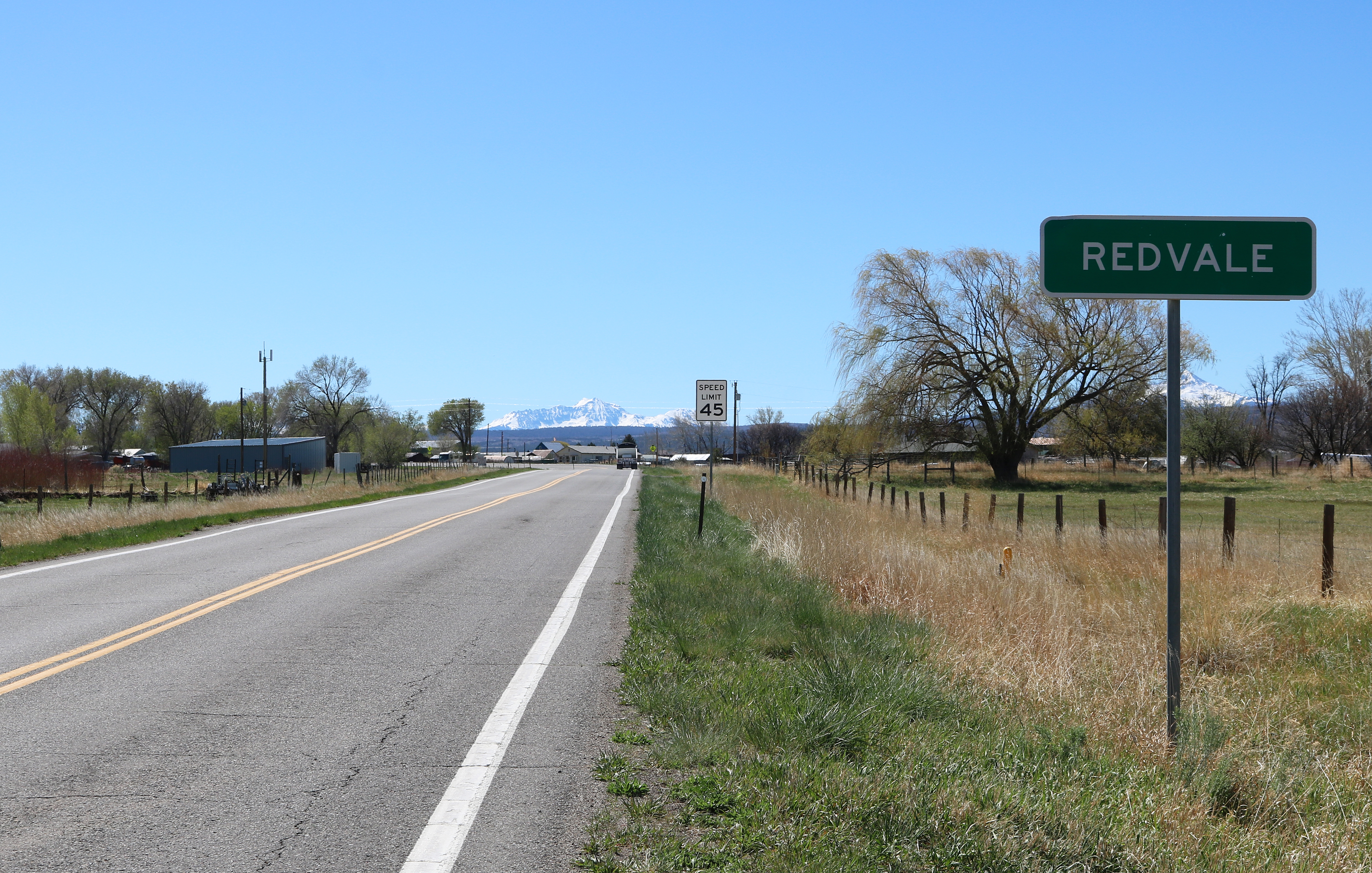
- Entering Redvale from the northwest on Colorado State Highway 145, April 2020

- Location in Montrose County, Colorado
- Coordinates: 38°10′34″N 108°24′45″W
- Country: United States
- State: Colorado
- County: Montrose

Government
  - Type: Unincorporated community

Area
  - Total: 4.680 sq mi (12.121 km^{2})
  - Land: 4.680 sq mi (12.121 km^{2})
  - Water: 0 sq mi (0.000 km^{2})
- Elevation: 6,500 ft (2,000 m)

Population (2020)
  - Total: 172
  - Density: 37/sq mi (14.2/km^{2})
- Time zone: UTC-7 (MST)
  - Summer (DST): UTC-6 (MDT)
- ZIP Code: 81431
- Area code: 970
- GNIS feature: 2629992

Redvale is a census-designated place (CDP) in Montrose County, Colorado, United States. The Redvale post office has the ZIP Code 81431. At the 2020 census, the population of the Redvale CDP was 172, down from 236 in 2010.

== Geography ==
Redvale is in southern Montrose County near the eastern end of the Colorado Plateau. The community is bordered to the south by San Miguel County. It sits atop Wrights Mesa, bordered by Naturita Canyon to the southwest and Maverick Draw to the northeast. Colorado State Highway 145 passes through the community, leading northwest 10 miles (16 km) to Naturita and southeast 9 miles (14 km) to Norwood.

The Redvale CDP has an area of 4.7 square miles (12.1 km^{2}), all land. The community is in the watershed of the San Miguel River, leading northwest to the Dolores River which flows into the Colorado River in Utah.

== Demographics ==
The United States Census Bureau initially defined the Redvale CDP for the United States Census 2010.

Redvale CDP, Colorado
Year	Pop.	±%
2010	236	—
2020	172	−27.1%
Source: United States Census Bureau

Redvale is a part of the Montrose, CO Micropolitan Statistical Area.
