= Colorado State Highway 90 =

State highway in Colorado, United States

State Highway 90
- SH 90 highlighted in red

Route information
- Maintained by CDOT
- Length: 41.9 mi (67.4 km)

Major junctions
- West end: SR-46 at the Utah border near Paradox
- SH 141 at Vancorum
- East end: US 550 at Montrose

Location
- Country: United States
- State: Colorado
- Counties: Montrose

Highway system
- Colorado State Highway System; Interstate; US; State; Scenic
← SH 89	→ SH 91

State Highway 90 (SH 90) is a 41.9 mi (67.4 km) long state highway at the western edge of Colorado. SH 90's western terminus is a continuation as Utah State Route 46 (SR-46) at the Utah state border, and the eastern terminus is at U.S. Route 550 (US 550) in Montrose.

== Route description ==
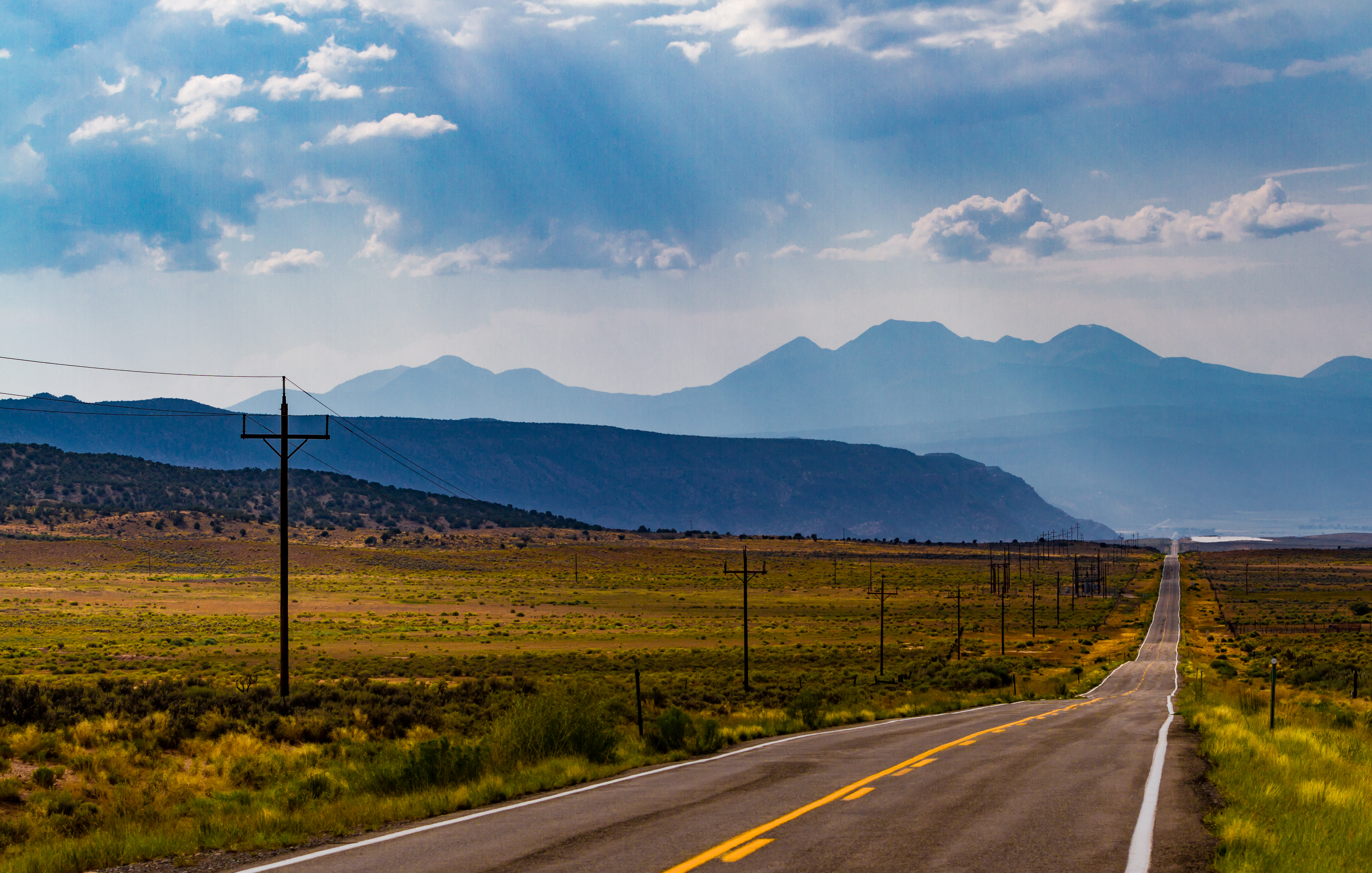
SH 90 through the Paradox Valley

SH 90 begins in the west at the border with Utah where it becomes Utah State Route 46 which continues westward to meet US 191 about twenty miles (32 km) south of Moab, UT. From the Utah border the road passes eastward for about 34 miles (55 km) through a very remote area, first along a section of La Sal Creek, then over a pass and though Paradox Valley, where it crosses the Dolores River Bridge near the town of Bedrock. After leaving the valley, it joins up with SH 141 at Vancorum where this portion of the road ends. The road then reappears approximately eight miles west of Montrose and travels into downtown Montrose where its western end occurs at its intersection with US 550. The two sections of the road are joined by a 49-mile (79 km) section composed mostly of unpaved road and a brief stretch of SH 141, neither of which are officially part of SH 90. Thus the official length of the road is 41.9 miles (67.4 km), but driving from one end to the other will require traveling at least 89 miles (143 km). If only paved routes are used, that distance increases considerably.

== History ==
The route was established in the 1920s without the current gap. In 1954, all was cut out except the current eastern section, and the current western section was added back in 1963. The route was also entirely paved by 1963.

== Major intersections ==
The entire route is in Montrose County.

Location	mi	km	Destinations	Notes
	0.000	0.000	SR-46 – La Sal Junction	Continuation beyond Utah state line; West end of western segment
Vancorum	33.874	54.515	SH 141 – Uravan, Naturita	East end of western segment
Gap in route
	81.533	131.215	CR 59 / CR 90	West end of eastern segment
Montrose	89.858	144.612	US 550 (Townsend Avenue) – Ouray, Gunnison, Grand Junction	East end of eastern segment
1.000 mi = 1.609 km; 1.000 km = 0.621 mi
