= Dolores Project =

Water control project in Colorado, United States

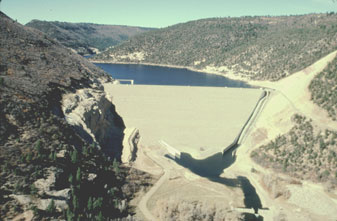
Mcphee Dam and Reservoir

The Dolores Project, located in the Dolores and San Juan River basins in southwestern Colorado, uses water from the Dolores River for irrigation, municipal and industrial use, recreation, fish and wildlife, and production of hydroelectric power. It also provides flood control and aids in economic redevelopment. The primary storage of Dolores River flows for all project purposes is provided by the McPhee Reservoir. Service is provided to the northwest Dove Creek area, central Montezuma Valley area, and south to the Towaoc area on the Ute Mountain Ute Indian Reservation. Irrigation water is available for 61,660 acres (249.5 km^{2}).
