= McPhee Reservoir =

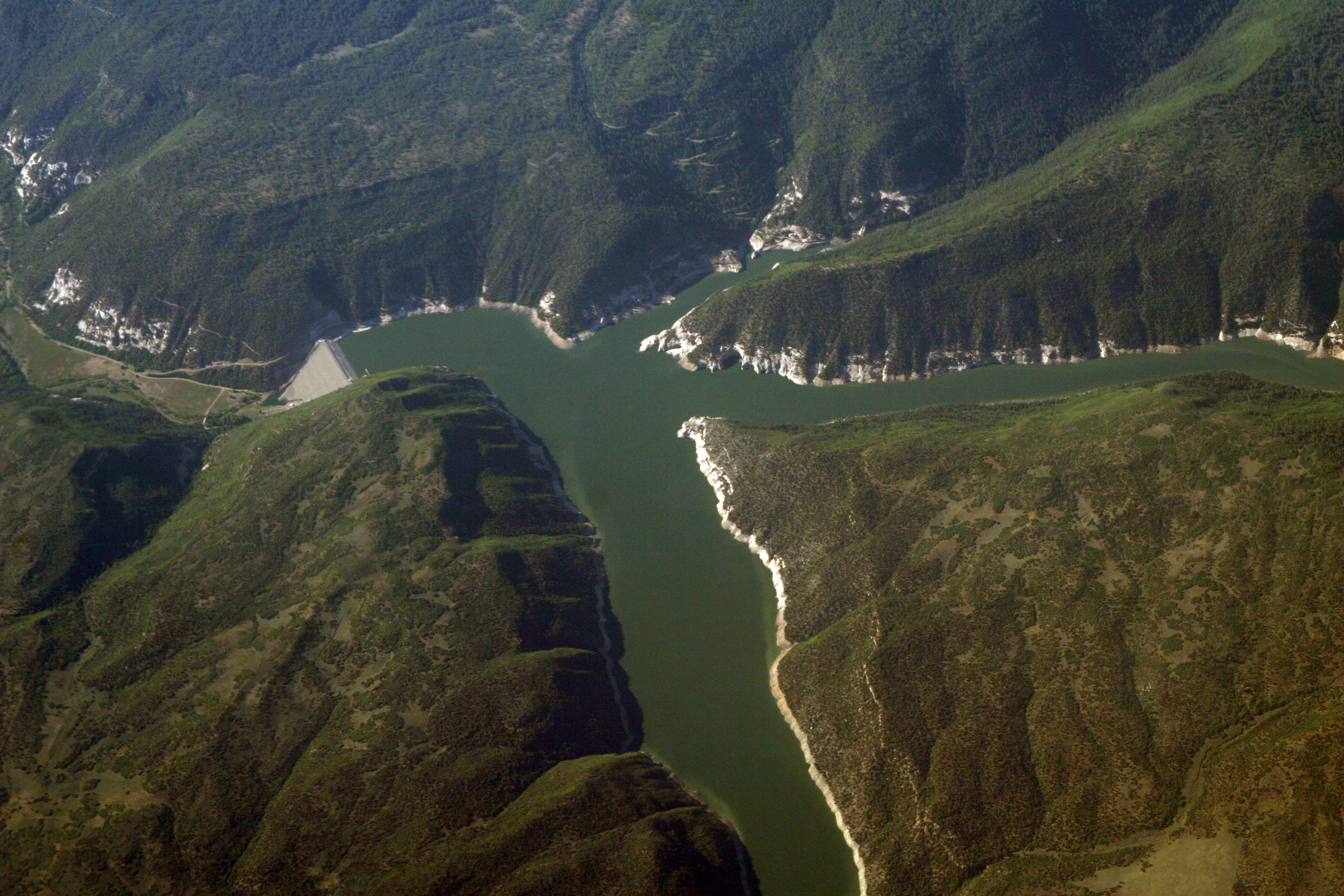
- McPhee Reservoir and dam, 2013

- Location within Colorado Location within the United States
- Location: Montezuma County, Colorado
- Coordinates: 37°34′39″N 108°34′20″W
- Type: reservoir
- Primary inflows: Dolores River; Plateau Creek; House Creek; Beaver Creek; Dry Creek
- Primary outflows: Dolores River; Dove Creek Canal
- Basin countries: United States
- Managing agency: United States Bureau of Reclamation; Dolores Water Conservancy District
- Surface area: 4,470 acres (1,810 hectares)
- Water volume: 381,051 acre⋅ft (470,019,000 m^{3})
- Surface elevation: 6,929 ft (2,112 m)
- Settlements: McPhee, Colorado, a ghost town beneath the lake

McPhee Reservoir is located in Montezuma County, Colorado, United States. It was constructed and is operated by the United States Bureau of Reclamation as part of the Dolores Project, and dams the Dolores River to furnish municipal and irrigation water for Montezuma and Dolores counties and the Ute Mountain Ute Indian Reservation.

McPhee Reservoir is named for McPhee, Colorado, a company town founded by the New Mexico Lumber Company that is now submerged under the reservoir. In 1927, the McPhee sawmill produced over half of Colorado's lumber. The town housed up to 1,500 employees. The sawmill closed in 1946.

The lake itself may be accessed from near Dolores, Colorado, by state highways 145 and 184, and offers various boat-launching facilities, picnic areas, and campgrounds in the McPhee Recreation Area operated by the U.S. Forest Service. The lake fills the lower end of the Dolores Valley, with the dam completed in 1985 across Dolores Canyon.

== Dams ==
The reservoir has two dams. First, McPhee Dam, NID ID CO02707, is a 295-foot (90-meter) high rockfill and earthen dam that can store up to 399,200 acre-feet (492,400,000 cubic meters) of water. It was built in 1983 and is 1,300 feet (400 meters) wide. The second dam, the Mcphee Great Cut Dike, NID ID CO02707S001, is a 75-foot (23-meter) high earthen dam. It was built in 1984 and is 2,006 feet (611 meters) wide.

== McPhee Dam Powerplant ==
A hydroelectric powerplant operates at the dam. Called the McPhee Dam Powerplant, it uses two turbines to power a 1,300 kilowatt generator. The plant produces 7,170,000 kilowatt-hours annually.

== See also ==
- List of largest reservoirs of Colorado
