= Memorial Rock =

Boulder in Colorado, United States

Coordinates: 37.5624°N 108.3717°W

Memorial Rock is a 8,500,000-pound (3,900,000 kg) boulder on State Highway 145 (SH 145) near Dolores in the US state of Colorado.

== Rockfall ==
Rockfall, caused by ice jacking during freeze-thaw cycles in the Rocky Mountains, is cited as a "chronic hazard" at over 750 locations by the Colorado Department of Transportation (CDOT). On May 24, 2019, a 10,000,000-pound (4,500,000 kg) rockfall from a 2,000-foot-high (610 m) mountain ledge occurred at milepost 22 of SH 145 near Dolores, completely covering and closing the highway. The largest rock in the rockfall left an eight-foot (2.4 m) trench behind it. Another, smaller boulder that weighed over 2,000,000 pounds (910,000 kg) and was 48 feet (15 m) long came down in the same rockfall and was blasted to fragments on May 26 by the state in order to reopen one lane of SH 145.

== Designation as landmark ==
When it was deemed impractical to remove or destroy with explosives, Governor Jared Polis declared the largest boulder would be named Memorial Rock as a memorial landmark and left where it came to rest; the highway would be rebuilt and rerouted slightly at a cost of over $1 million. The governor stated he hoped it would become a tourist attraction, and the state would be seeking a matching designation and funding from the U.S. Federal Government.

== See also ==
- List of individual rocks
