= Colorado State Highway 97 =

State highway in Colorado, United States

State Highway 97
- SH 97 highlighted in red

Route information
- Maintained by CDOT
- Length: 4.584 mi (7.377 km)

Major junctions
- South end: SH 141 in Naturita
- North end: 3rd Avenue in Nucla

Location
- Country: United States
- State: Colorado
- Counties: Montrose

Highway system
- Colorado State Highway System; Interstate; US; State; Scenic
← SH 96	→ SH 100

State Highway 97 (SH 97) is a Colorado state highway connecting Nucla and Naturita. SH 97's southern terminus is at SH 141 in Naturita, and the northern terminus is at 3rd Avenue in Nucla.

== Route description ==
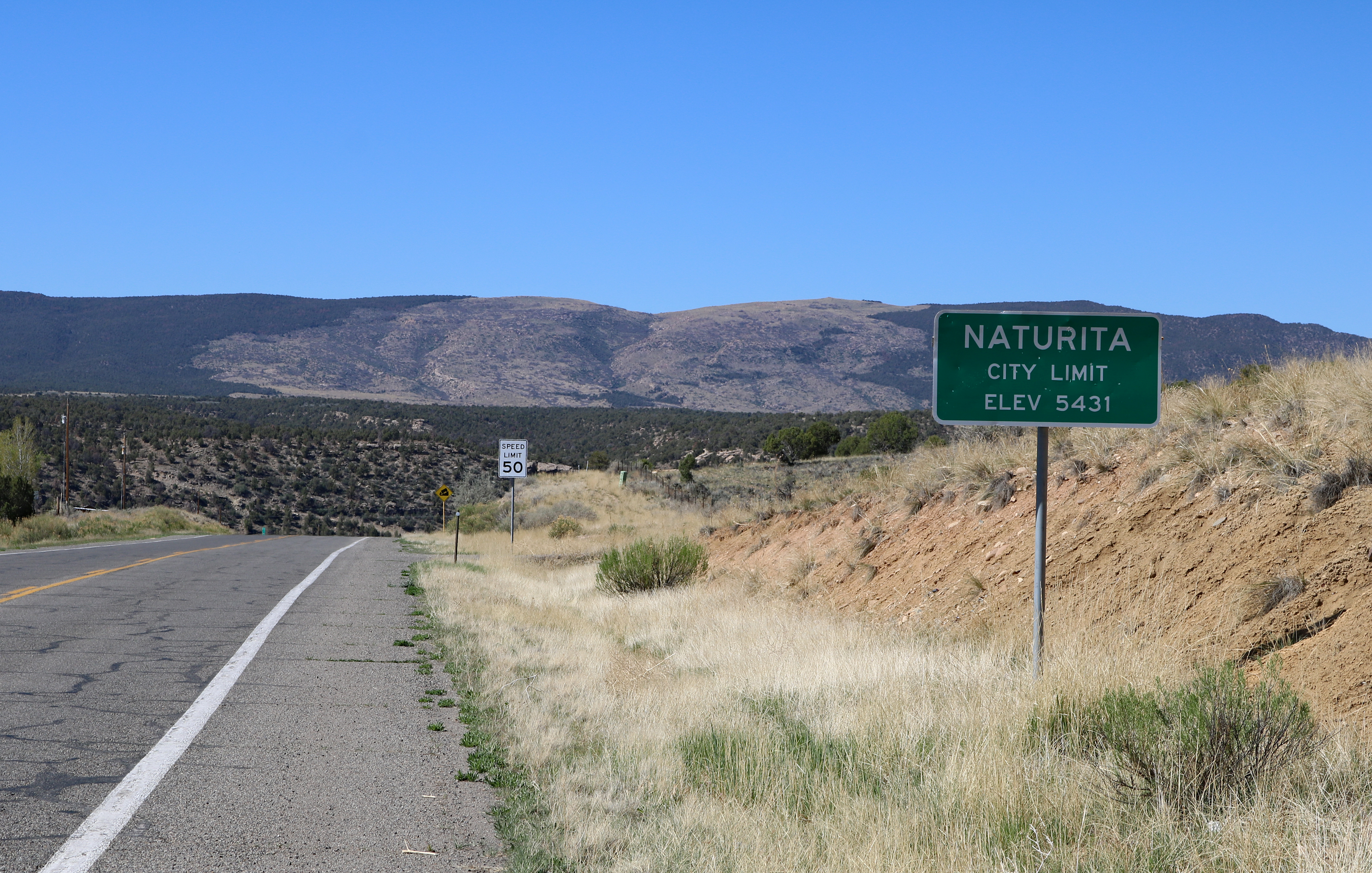
Entering Naturita from the north

SH 97 runs 4.6 miles (7.4 km), starting at a junction with State Highway 141 in Naturita. The highway goes north across the San Miguel River, ending in Nucla.

== Major intersections ==
The entire route is in Montrose County.

Location	mi	km	Destinations	Notes
Naturita	0.000	0.000	SH 141 – Norwood, Uravan	Southern terminus
Nucla	4.584	7.377	3rd Avenue	Northern terminus
1.000 mi = 1.609 km; 1.000 km = 0.621 mi
