= West Dolores River =

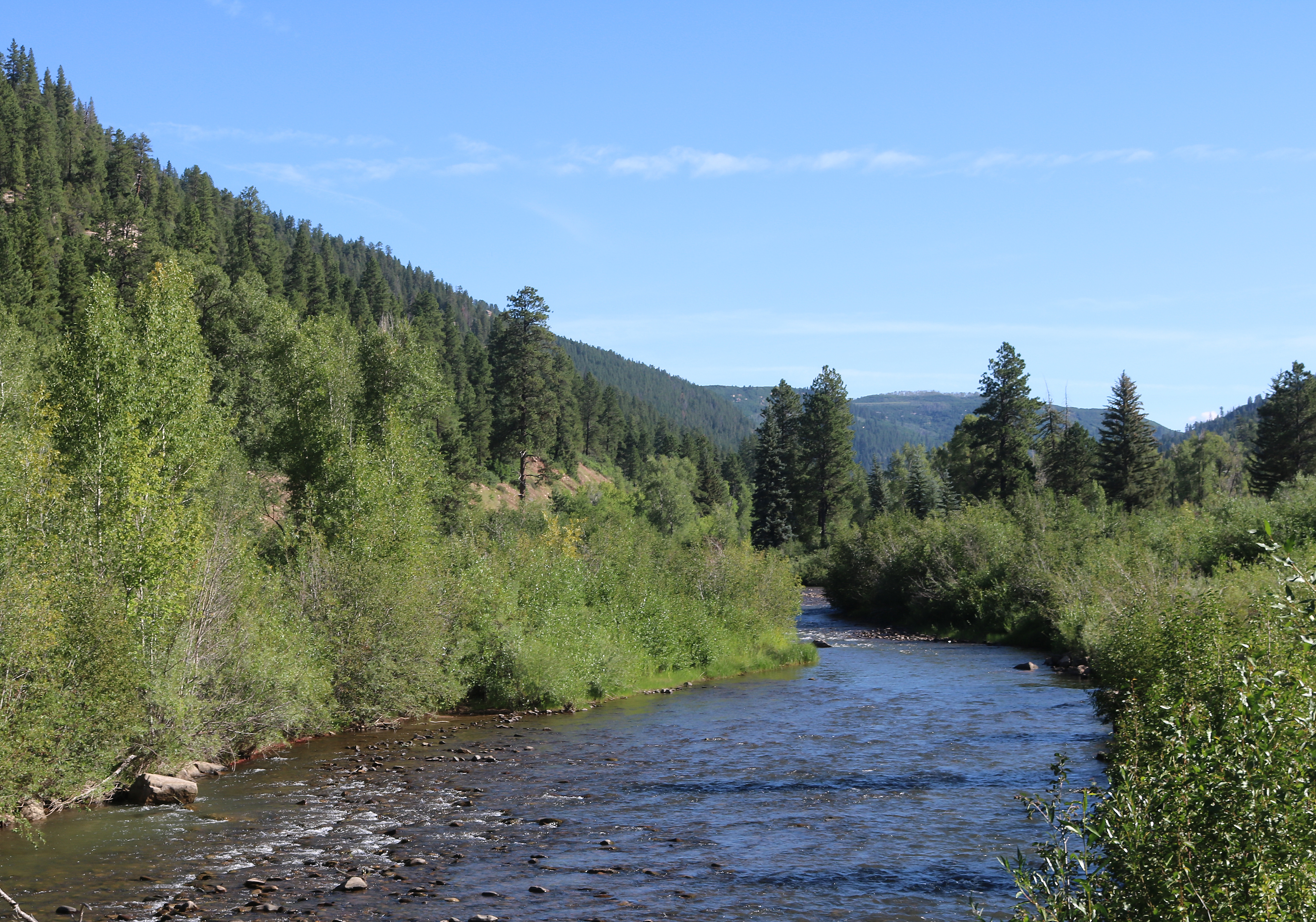
- The river just before its confluence with the Dolores River.

Physical characteristics
- Source
  - coordinates: 37°50′50″N 108°00′10″W
- Mouth
  - location: Confluence with Dolores River
  - coordinates: 37°35′13″N 108°21′35″W
  - elevation: 7,369 ft (2,246 m)

Basin features
- Progression: Dolores—Colorado

The West Dolores River is a 35.0-mile-long (56.3 km) tributary of the Dolores River, in southwestern Colorado in the United States. Its source is northeast of Mount Wilson in the Lizard Head Wilderness of Dolores County, Colorado. The river flows southwest to a confluence with the Dolores in Montezuma County.

== See also ==
- List of rivers of Colorado
- List of tributaries of the Colorado River
