= Juan Rivera (explorer) =

Spanish explorer (1738–??)

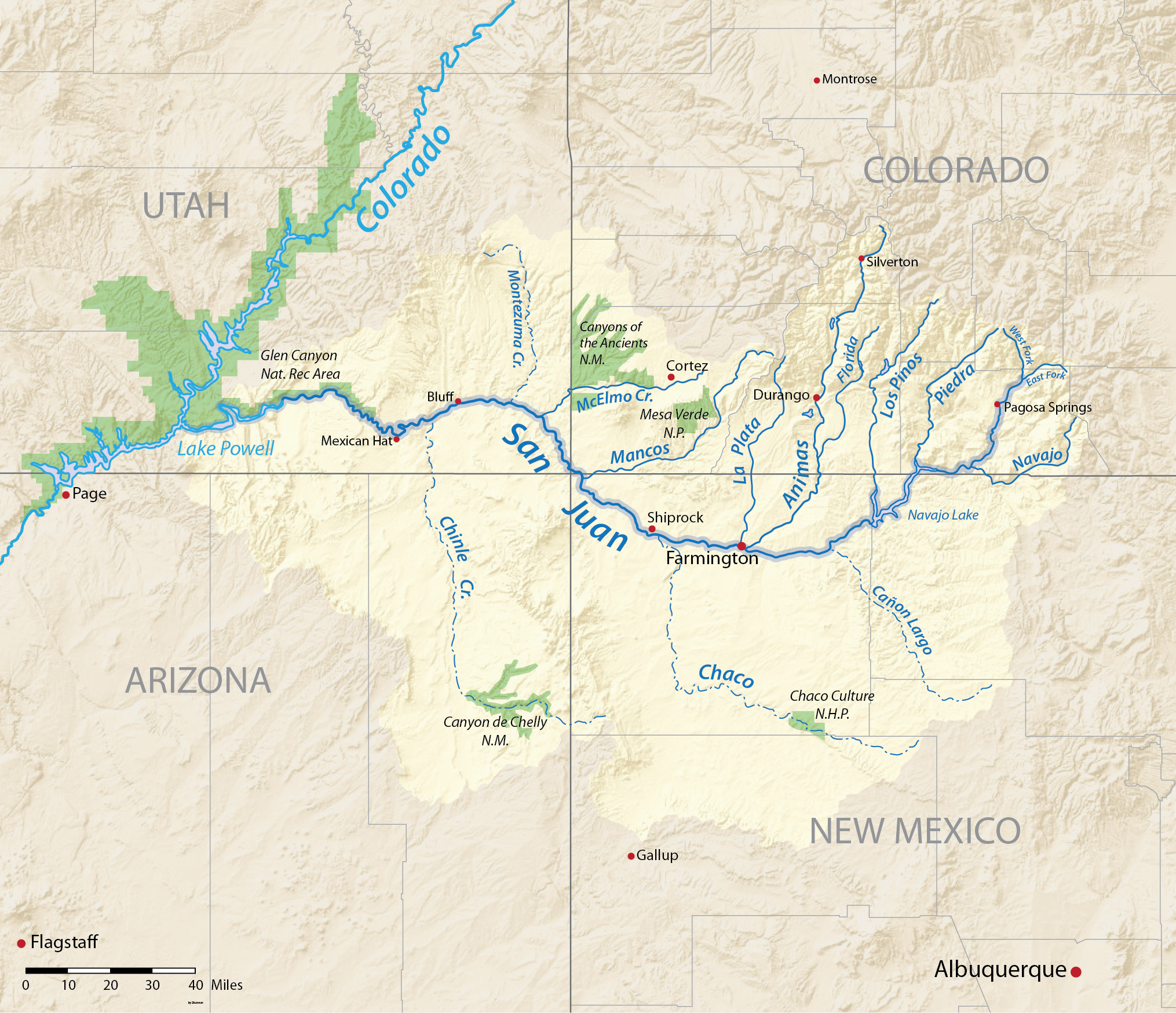
Rivera's explorations were in the watersheds of the San Juan and Colorado Rivers of Colorado and Utah.

Juan María Antonio de Rivera, also spelled Ribera, (b.1738 - d.?) was an 18th-century Spanish explorer who explored southwestern North America, including parts of the southern Rocky Mountains. In 1765, at the request of Governor Tomás Vélez Cachupin of New Mexico, he led two expeditions from Abiquiu northward through present-day Colorado and Utah, partly in search of silver and to locate the upper course of the Colorado River, but also to help thwart the expansion of competing European powers. His expeditions passed through regions inhabited by the Ute and Southern Paiute tribes.

== Early life ==
Little is known of Juan Rivera. He is probably the Juan Antonio Maria de Rivera who was baptized in Chihuahua, Mexico on January 19, 1738. If son, his parents were Juan José de Rivera and Josefa Mónica Enriquez. He probably came to New Mexico with Governor Vélez Cachupin in 1762. The governor did not call him "Don" which indicates that he was not highly-born nor a member of the aristocracy of New Mexico. His writings indicate that he had a knowledge of mining.

== First expedition ==
Ute Native Americans (Indians) who lived north of the colony of New Mexico brought lumps of silver to New Mexico to trade. Searching for silver was one objective of Rivera's first expedition. The Governor's instructions to Riviera have not survived, but it appears also that he was to find a route to the "Great River" (the Colorado). The expedition also had the characteristic of a military reconnaissance of unknown territories. The Spanish had long feared that the French would encroach upon New Mexico. Rivera's expedition was small, numbering only seven Spaniards and an interpreter, a genizaro (a detribalized Indian). Rivera left Abiquiu on June 25, 1765 and traveled westward. On June 30, he camped along a river about 12 mi (19 km) south of present-day Pagosa Springs, Colorado. He named the river the San Juan. Continuing on he arrived and named the Rio de los Pinos (near present day Bayfield where he detected signs of ancient mining. Near present day Durango he found an encampment of Utes. He named the Animas River there. Pursuing claims of silver and with Ute escorts, the Spaniards explored the area, but found nothing. With Ute guides, they proceeded onward naming the Dolores River and reaching the area of present-day Bluff, Utah. Returning to near Durango again, He found evidence of mining and a large village which he said was larger than Santa Cruz, New Mexico, which had a population then of 1,600. He mentioned ancient torreones (towers) and ruins there, possibly the remnants of a settlement of Ancestral Pueblos from hundreds of years earlier. On July 23, Rivera and his men began their return, arriving in Santa Fe on July 30.

== Second expedition ==
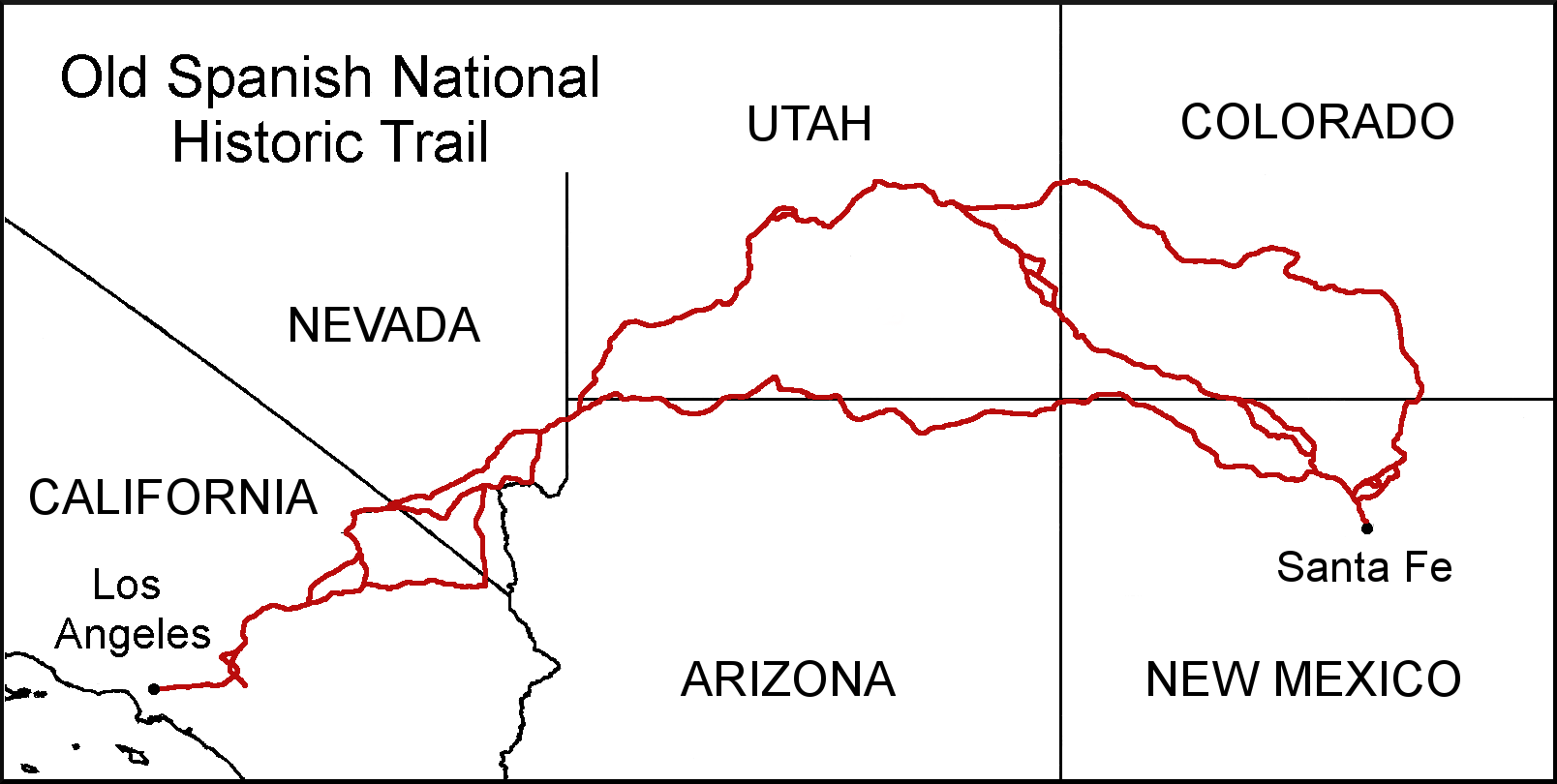
Rivera pioneered the first part of what became the Old Spanish Trail.

Rivera set out on his second expedition in September 1765 with an explicit instructions from Governor Vélez to find the ford where the Utes crossed the Colorado River. The Spanish were hoping to find a route that could lead to further explorations. On his previous expedition, Ute guides had promised that, if Rivera returned, they would guide him to the ford they used to cross the Colorado. The actions of the Utes on his second expedition indicated that some of them opposed helping the Spanish learn about their territory. However, the Utes also wished to maintain good relations with the Spanish as they traded for guns and other items in Taos and Abiquiu. Slaves and furs were their most important trade items.

Rivera and the members of his expedition followed the same route as before to the Dolores River in Colorado where they met some of their Ute guides from the first expedition. On October 6, they left the Dolores with guides. The guides led them on a circuitous route, apparently hoping to lead them astray. The route followed by Rivera has been a source of disagreement among scholars. In 1976 Donald C. Cutter concluded that the expedition had reached a ford across the Colorado river near Moab, Utah. Other scholars echoed that opinion and supplied details. In 2004, in the light of new scholarship, Cutter reversed his previous view and said instead that Riviera had journeyed to a ford across the Gunnison River west of present-day Delta, Colorado. The Gunnison is a major tributary of the Colorado. Subsequent scholarship has fortified that opinion. Rivera followed the Gunnison River eastward and upstream to the vicinity of Montrose, Colorado. His description of the Marsh of San Francisco (near the present-day Ute Indian Museum) helped historians determine his route. The Utes warned him not to proceed further east because of raids in the area by the people who became known as the Comanche. He then headed south crossing the Uncompahgre Plateau in his return to New Mexico. The Domínguez–Escalante expedition followed Rivera's route to the Gunnison River ten years later. Rivera's explorations led the way to the establishment of the Old Spanish Trail from New Mexico to the Spanish colony of California.

Nothing more is known of Rivera after his return to New Mexico in November 1765.
