= Dolores River Bridge =

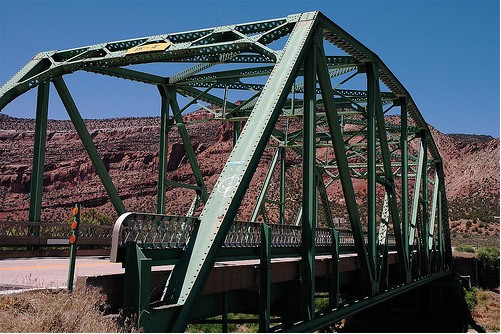
- Coordinates: 38.31067°N 108.88577°W
- Carries: SH 90
- Crosses: Dolores River
- Locale: Near Bedrock, Colorado

Characteristics
- Design: Through truss
- Total length: 125 ft (38.1 m)
- Width: 23.9 ft (7.3 m)
- Longest span: 128.9 ft (39.3 m)
- Clearance above: 15.6 m (51.2 ft)

History
- Construction end: 1952
- Opened: 1952
- Closed: 2014

Statistics
- Daily traffic: 319 (as of 2003)
- Dolores River Bridge
- U.S. National Register of Historic Places
- Built: 1952
- Architect: Colorado Department of Highways
- Architectural style: Pennsylvania through truss
- MPS: Highway Bridges in Colorado MPS
- NRHP reference No.: 02001150
- Added to NRHP: October 15, 2002

Location
- Interactive map of Dolores River Bridge

The Dolores River Bridge was a through truss bridge that spanned the Dolores River near Bedrock, Colorado, United States. It carried State Highway 90 and was listed on the National Register of Historic Places.

== Overview ==
The bridge was designed by the Colorado Department of Highways and was fabricated by Midwest Steel & Iron Works. It was installed in 1952 by contractor Gardner Construction Company. It was located at milepost 15.22, 0.4 miles (0.64 km) east of Bedrock. Its structure was 129 feet (39 m) long and 25.1 feet (7.7 m) wide, with a main span of 125 feet (38 m) and a roadway width of 24 feet (7.3 m).

== Dismantling and replacement ==
In 2014, inspectors discovered a crack in one of the bridge's main beams. The Colorado Department of Transportation (CDOT) then closed the bridge to traffic and installed a one-lane, temporary bridge. With the temporary bridge in place, the old bridge was dismantled, its pieces labeled and stored in a warehouse for possible future use as a footbridge or bike trail bridge. CDOT then constructed a new precast-concrete girder bridge, which opened to traffic in 2017.

== See also ==
- List of bridges documented by the Historic American Engineering Record in Colorado
