= Antecedent drainage stream =

Stream maintaining its original course despite changes in underlying rocks

An antecedent stream is a stream that maintains its original course and pattern despite the changes in underlying rock topography. A stream with a dendritic drainage pattern, for example, can be subject to slow tectonic uplift. However, as the uplift occurs, the stream erodes through the rising ridge to form a steep-walled gorge. The stream thus keeps its dendritic pattern even though it flows over a landscape that will normally produce a trellis drainage pattern.

A superimposed stream is a stream that forms over horizontal beds that overlie folded and faulted rock with varying resistance. Having cut down through the horizontal beds, the stream retains its course and pattern as it proceeds to erode the underlying rocks despite their different character. The stream erodes a gorge in the resistant bed and continues its flow as before.

== Examples ==
- Many Himalayan rivers are good examples of antecedent origin. These rivers originated well before the Himalayan region was uplifted. The rivers Indus, Brahmaputra, Sutlej, Kosi and Subansiri originated on the Tibetan side and now traverse the existing mountain ranges, cutting deep gorges.
- The Colorado River cut the Grand Canyon as the Colorado Plateau rose between 5 and 2.5 million years ago. Paradox Valley is another good example in the Colorado Plateau.
- Devil's Gate in Wyoming is a remarkable display of an antecedent stream. A 100-meter slot is cut through a granite ridge which would have missed the ridge completely had the river flowed just a kilometer to the south.
- The Meuse still flows south-north from France to Belgium through the Ardennes which were elevated after the river had assumed that course.

== See also ==
- Canyon
- Water gap
- Wind gap
