= Nucla, Colorado =

Town in Colorado, United States

- Town
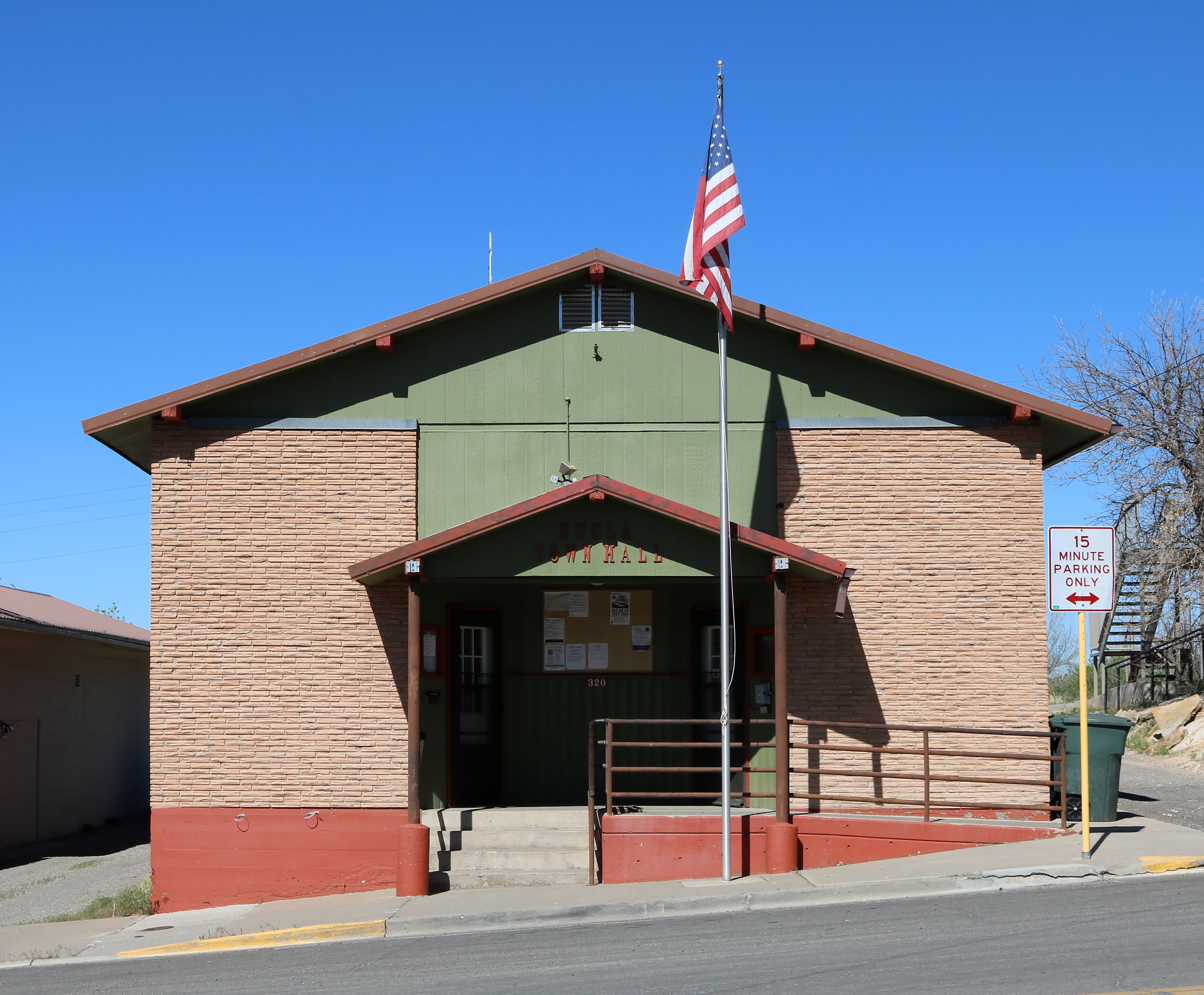
- Town hall

- Location in Montrose County, Colorado
- Coordinates: 38°16′00″N 108°32′55″W
- Country: United States
- State: Colorado
- County: Montrose
- Incorporated (town): March 14, 1915

Government
  - Type: Statutory town

Area
  - Total: 0.69 sq mi (1.80 km^{2})
  - Land: 0.69 sq mi (1.80 km^{2})
  - Water: 0 sq mi (0.00 km^{2})
- Elevation: 5,752 ft (1,753 m)

Population (2020)
  - Total: 585
  - Density: 842.9/sq mi (325.4/km^{2})
- Time zone: UTC-7 (Mountain (MST))
  - Summer (DST): UTC-6 (MDT)
- ZIP code: 81424
- Area code: 970
- FIPS code: 08-54935
- GNIS feature ID: 2413058
- Website: townofnucla.colorado.gov

Nucla is a statutory town in Montrose County, Colorado, United States. The population was 585 as of the 2020 census, down from 711 in 2010. Its name comes from the town founders' intent that it serve as a "nucleus" for the surrounding farms and mines, although it has since come to be associated with the growth of uranium mining in the region.

== Geography ==
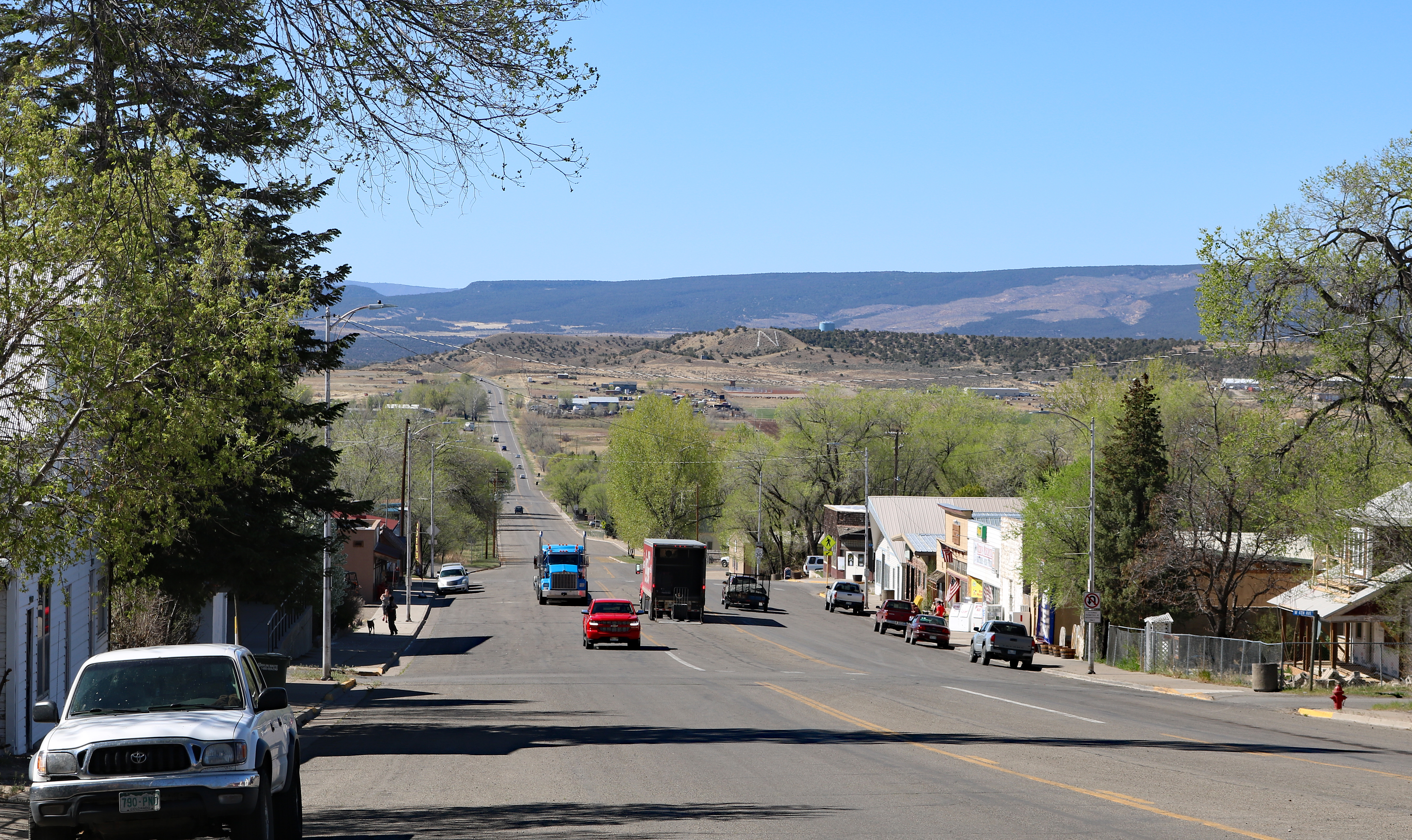
Looking south along Main Street

Nucla is located in southwestern Montrose County. It is at the northern terminus of Colorado State Highway 97, which leads south 4 miles (6 km) to Naturita, the only other incorporated place in the area. The Uncompahgre Plateau rises to the northeast.

According to the United States Census Bureau, the town has a total area of 0.6 square miles (1.6 km^{2}), all of it land.

== Demographics ==
Historical population
Census	Pop.	Note	%±
1920	217		—
1930	221		1.8%
1940	361		63.3%
1950	457		26.6%
1960	906		98.2%
1970	949		4.7%
1980	1,027		8.2%
1990	656		−36.1%
2000	734		11.9%
2010	711		−3.1%
2020	585		−17.7%
U.S. Decennial Census

As of the census of 2000, there were 734 people, 311 households, and 208 families residing in the town. The population density was 1,036.0 inhabitants per square mile (400.0/km^{2}). There were 369 housing units at an average density of 520.8 units per square mile (201.1 units/km^{2}). The racial makeup of the town was 94.69% White, 1.09% Native American, 0.14% Asian, 0.54% from other races, and 3.54% from two or more races. Hispanic or Latino of any race were 3.68% of the population.

There were 311 households, out of which 31.8% had children under the age of 18 living with them, 49.8% were married couples living together, 11.3% had a female householder with no husband present, and 32.8% were non-families. 30.5% of all households were made up of individuals, and 14.8% had someone living alone who was 65 years of age or older. The average household size was 2.36 and the average family size was 2.91.

In the town, the population was spread out, with 28.6% under the age of 18, 6.5% from 18 to 24, 24.3% from 25 to 44, 27.9% from 45 to 64, and 12.7% who were 65 years of age or older. The median age was 39 years. For every 100 females, there were 93.7 males. For every 100 females age 18 and over, there were 89.9 males.

The median income for a household in the town was $28,466, and the median income for a family was $33,636. Males had a median income of $32,417 versus $21,726 for females. The per capita income for the town was $12,982. About 14.4% of families and 17.0% of the population were below the poverty line, including 23.4% of those under age 18 and 12.1% of those age 65 or over.

== History ==
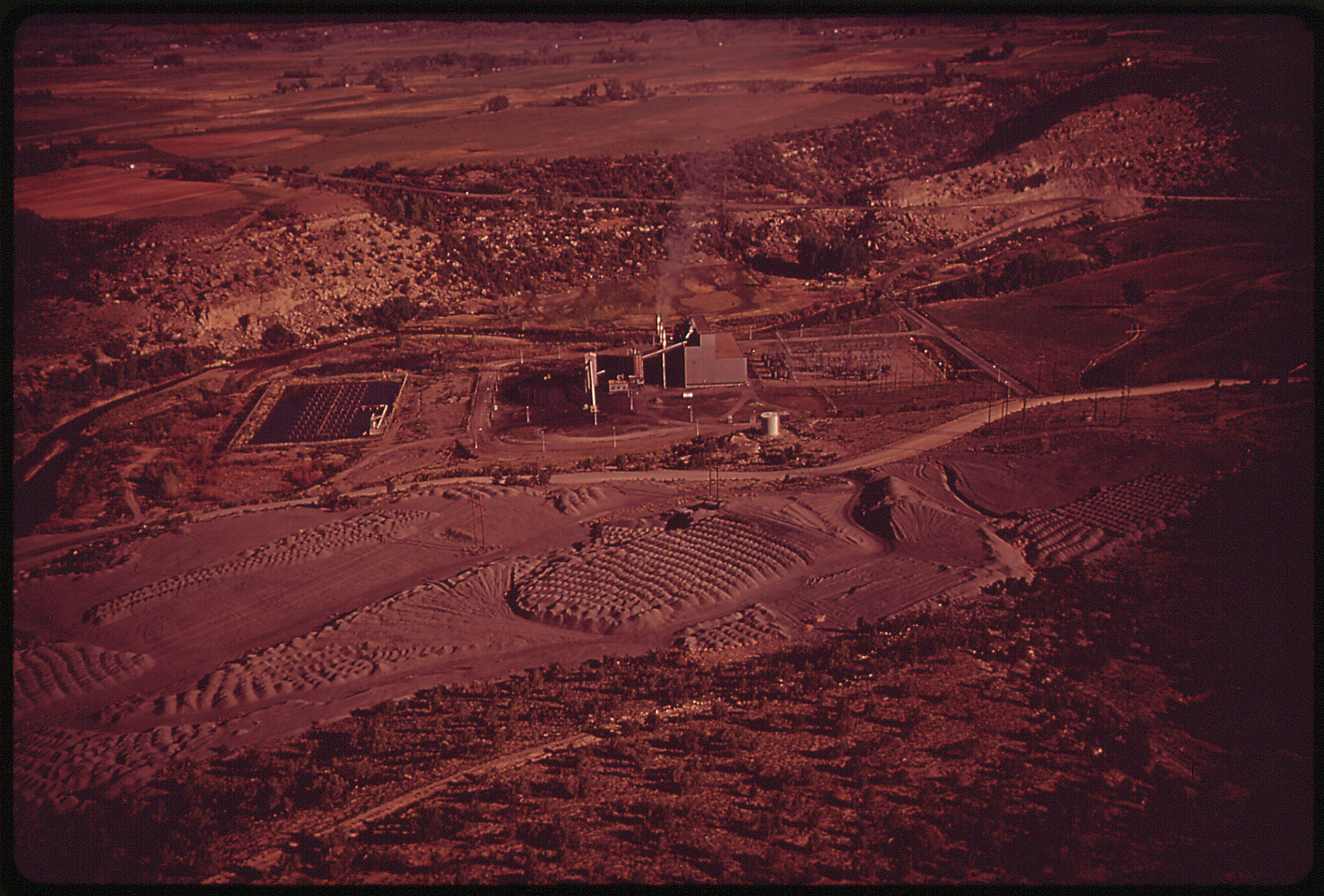
A 1972 photograph of a coal-burning power plant in Nucla

There are several prehistoric sites near Nucla on the Colorado State Register of Historic Properties:

- Cottonwood Cave is a large rock shelter inhabited by 270 BC and the earliest date at which corn was found in the state of Colorado.
- Tabeguache Cave is another prehistoric rock shelter.
- Tabeguache Pueblo is an example of an early, dispersed Ancient Pueblo settlement, inhabited about AD 1100 and later abandoned.

The town was established by socialists, who emphasized the sharing of things. The name of the town comes from the word nucleus.

In 1990, residents of Nucla hosted the first Top Dog World Championship Prairie Dog Shoot competition, which resulted in killing nearly 3,000 prairie dogs.

In May 2013, the Nucla Town Board passed an ordinance that required every non-exempted head of household in the town to own a firearm.

== Notable people ==
- W. A. Draves (1912–1994), founder of the Church of Christ with the Elijah Message
- Bill Symons (born 1943), Canadian Football Hall of Famer

== See also ==
- Montrose, CO Micropolitan Statistical Area
