= Colorado State Highway 145 =

State highway in Colorado, United States

State Highway 145
- SH 145 highlighted in red

Route information
- Maintained by CDOT
- Length: 116.879 mi (188.099 km)

Major junctions
- South end: US 160 at Cortez
- SH 184 near Dolores; SH 62 at Placerville
- North end: SH 141 near Naturita

Location
- Country: United States
- State: Colorado
- Counties: Montezuma, Dolores, San Miguel, Montrose

Highway system
- Colorado State Highway System; Interstate; US; State; Scenic
← SH 144	→ SH 149

State Highway 145 (SH 145) is a state highway in western Colorado. It runs for 116.879 miles (188.1 km) between U.S. Route 160 (US 160) in Cortez and SH 141 near Naturita.

== Route description ==
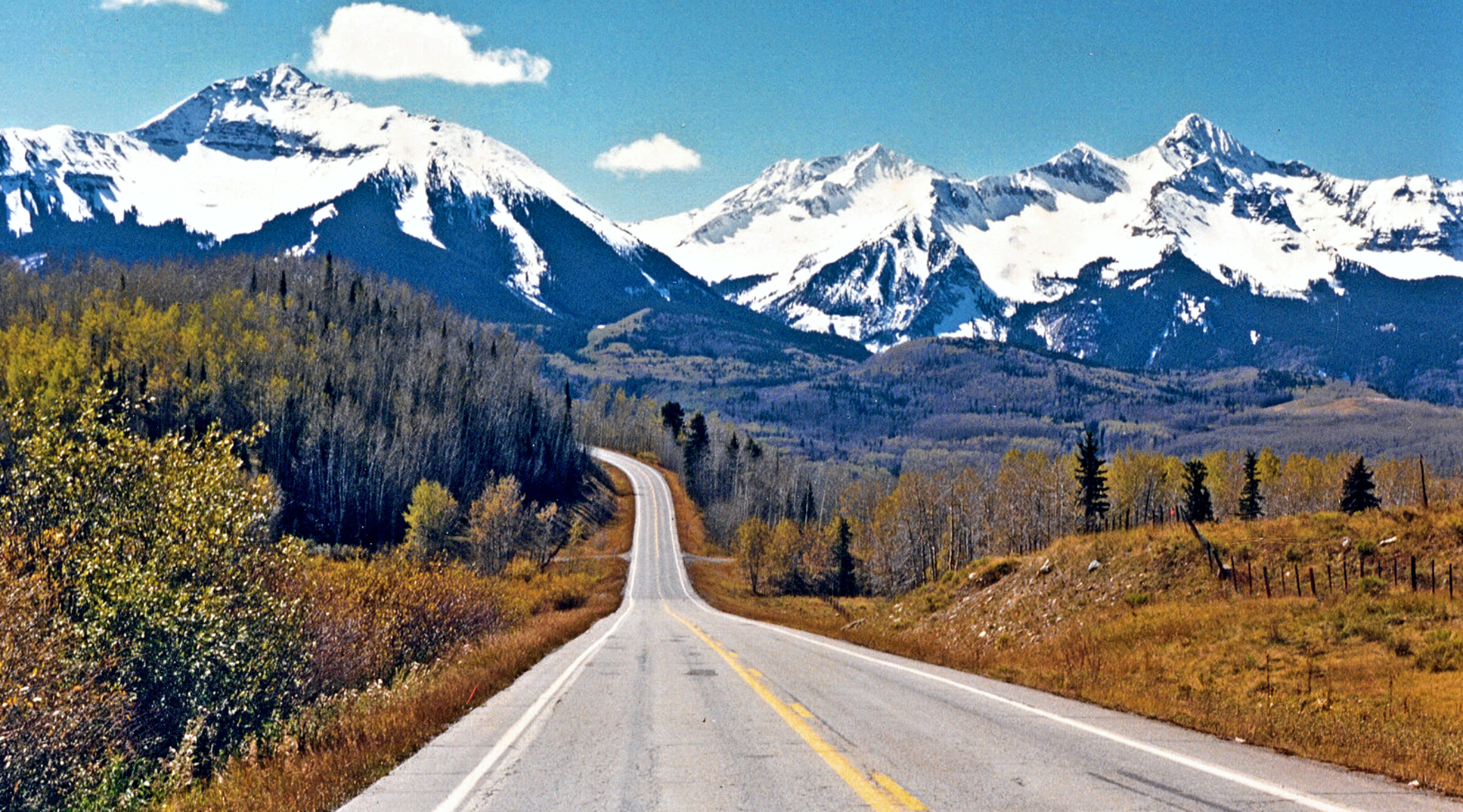
Southbound 145 view of Sunshine Mountain and Wilson Peak

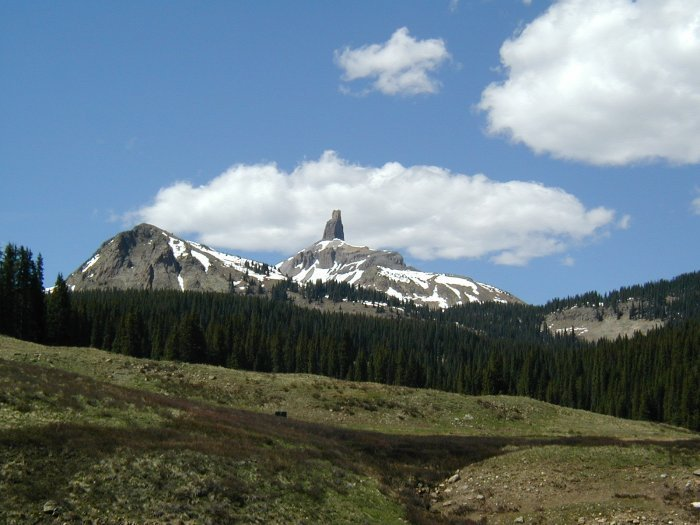
Lizard Head Peak along SH 145

The route begins in the south at its intersection with US 160 in the eastern portion of the city of Cortez. The route winds northward through the towns of Dolores, Rico, Sawpit, Placerville, Norwood, and Redvale before terminating at the junction with SH 141 about four miles (6.4 km) east of Naturita. Just north of its midpoint between Rico and Sawpit, the road also passes very near and provides access to the town of Telluride as well as Trout Lake.

== History ==
On May 24, 2019, a large boulder fell onto a section of SH-145 near Dolores and covered the roadway. It was deemed too impractical to move or destroy, and the highway was instead realigned in July, and the rock, named Memorial Rock, was dubbed a landmark.

== Major intersections ==
County	Location	mi	km	Destinations	Notes
Montezuma	Cortez	0.000	0.000	US 160 – Durango, Cortez	Southern terminus
Montezuma		7.864	12.656	SH 184 west – Dove Creek	Southern end of SH 184 overlap
Montezuma		8.729	14.048	SH 184 east – Mancos	Northern end of SH 184 overlap
Dolores	No major junctions				
San Miguel	Placerville	84.289	135.650	SH 62 east – Montrose, Ridgway	Western terminus of SH 62
Montrose		116.879	188.099	SH 141 – Dove Creek	Northern terminus
1.000 mi = 1.609 km; 1.000 km = 0.621 mi: Concurrency terminus
