= Paradox, Colorado =

Unincorporated community in Montrose County, CO, USA

- Unincorporated community
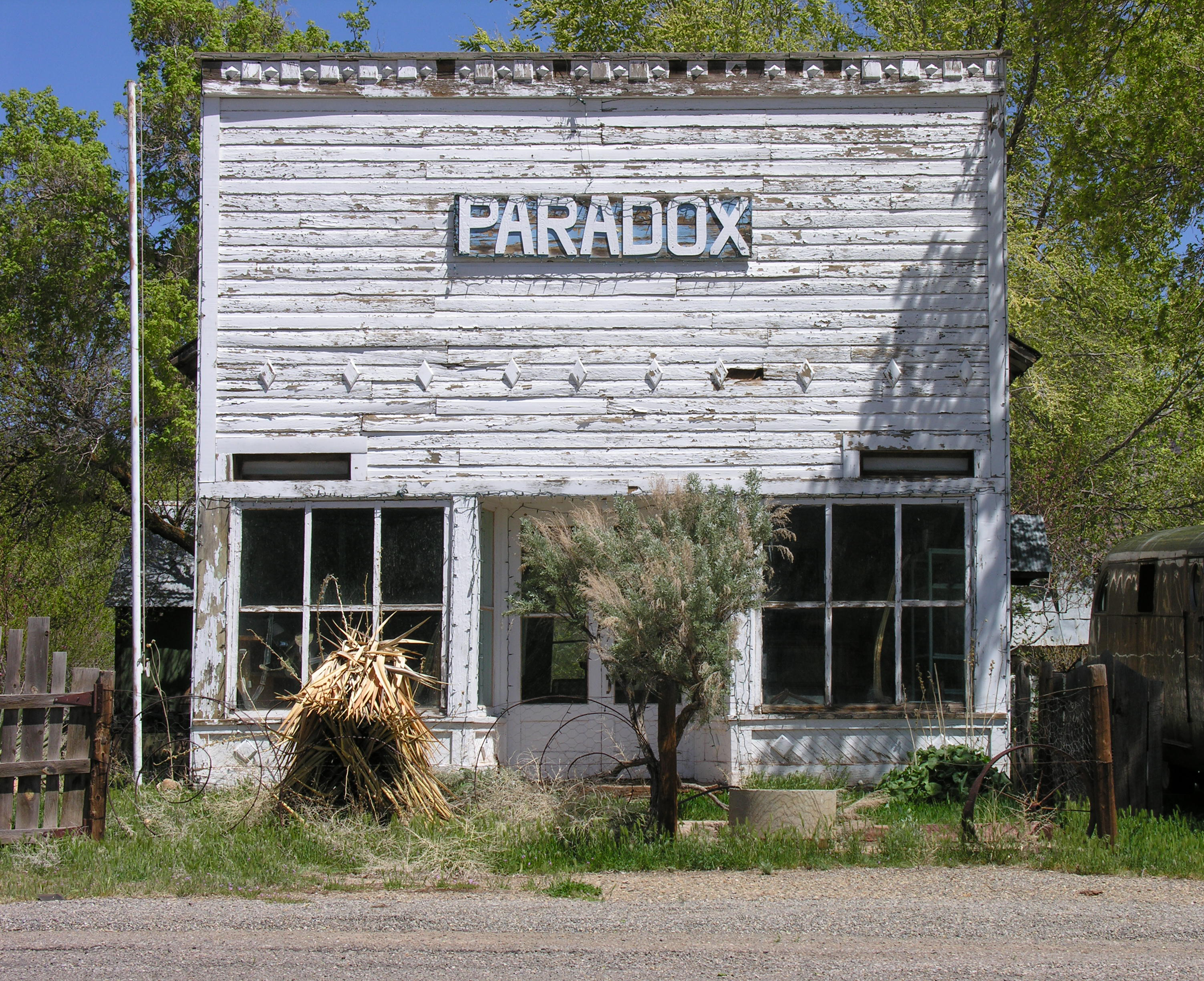
- Paradox wooden storefront in 2010

- Location within Colorado Location within the United States
- Coordinates: 38°22′06″N 108°57′44″W
- Country: United States
- State: Colorado
- County: Montrose
- Elevation: 5,299 ft (1,615 m)
- Time zone: UTC-7 (MST)
  - Summer (DST): UTC-6 (MDT)
- ZIP code: 81429
- Area code: 970
- GNIS feature ID: 185829

Paradox is an unincorporated community and a U.S. Post Office located in the Paradox Valley, Montrose County, Colorado, United States. The Paradox Post Office has the ZIP Code 81429.

== Name ==
The geologist, Albert Charles Peale named Paradox in 1875; he declared that the Dolores River had the “desire to perform strange and unexpected things” due to the unusual course of the river. Rather than flowing parallel to the valley, the river runs horizontally across the valley, cutting through cliff walls at 90 degree angles.

George R. Eichler wrote in the book, Colorado Place Names, that Paradox was nearly inaccessible to early settlers. To enter the valley, travellers had to disembark to unload their wagons. The wagons were then disassembled, and the pieces were then lowered to the valley on ropes.

== History ==
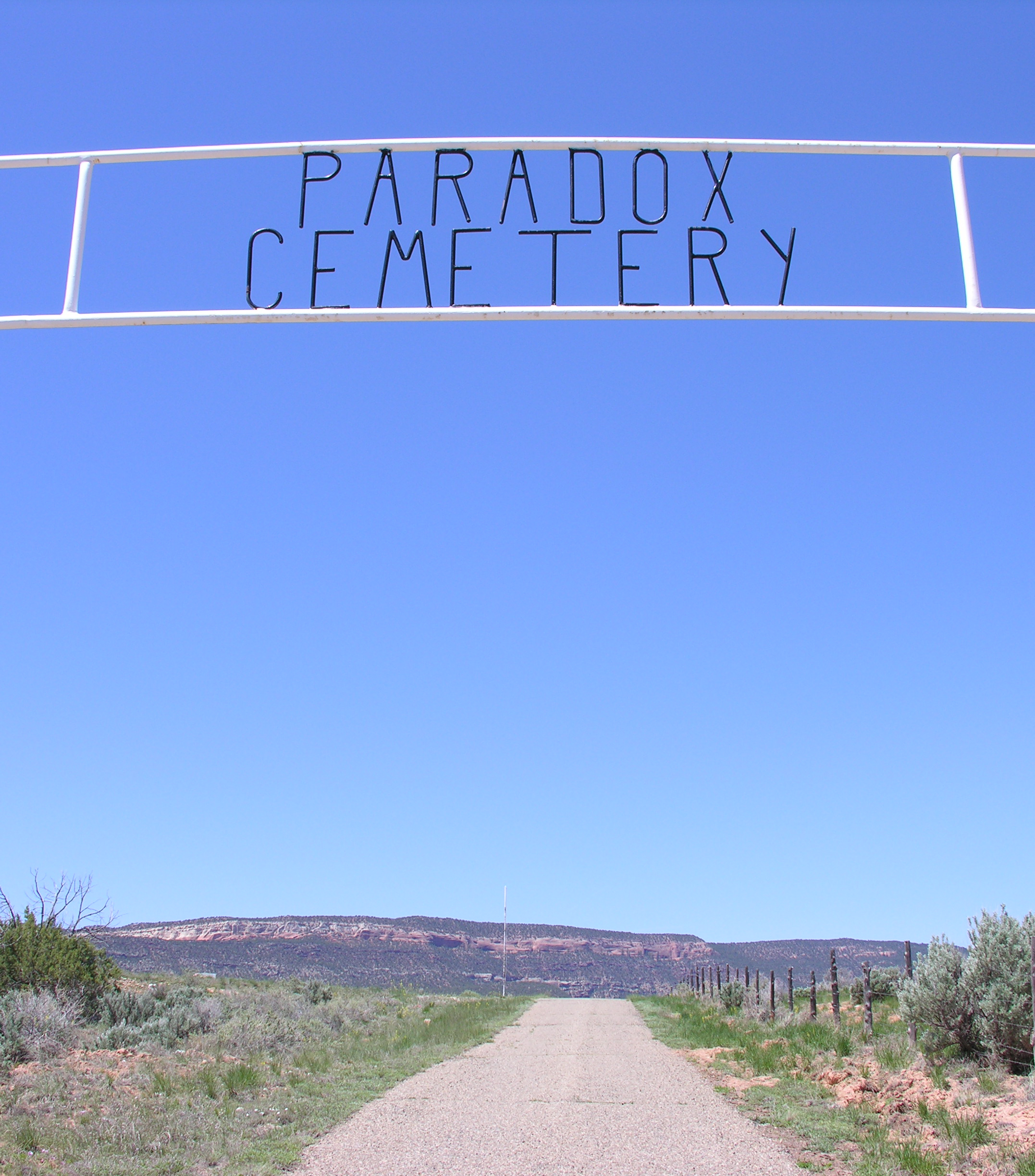
Road to Paradox Cemetery

The Paradox area had originally been home to the Ute people. It was later settled by Euro-American ranchers in the 1870's. In 1882, a post office was established. In 1897 mining began, first copper and later uranium. Paradox is a yellowcake boomtown. Uranium ore was first discovered at the Raja mine, and a sample was shipped to Marie Curie in France, although other sources state that specimens were shipped to Freidel and Cumenge in France for analysis.

In 2010 The New Yorker magazine featured an article, The Uranium Widows, on the spouses of deceased Paradox uranium workers who died from extended exposure to uranium during their employment in the local mines and mills.

== Geography ==
Paradox is located in Paradox Valley.

== Population ==
In 1991, the population of Paradox was "around two hundred."
