= Bedrock, Colorado =

Unincorporated community in Montrose County, Colorado, United States

- Unincorporated community
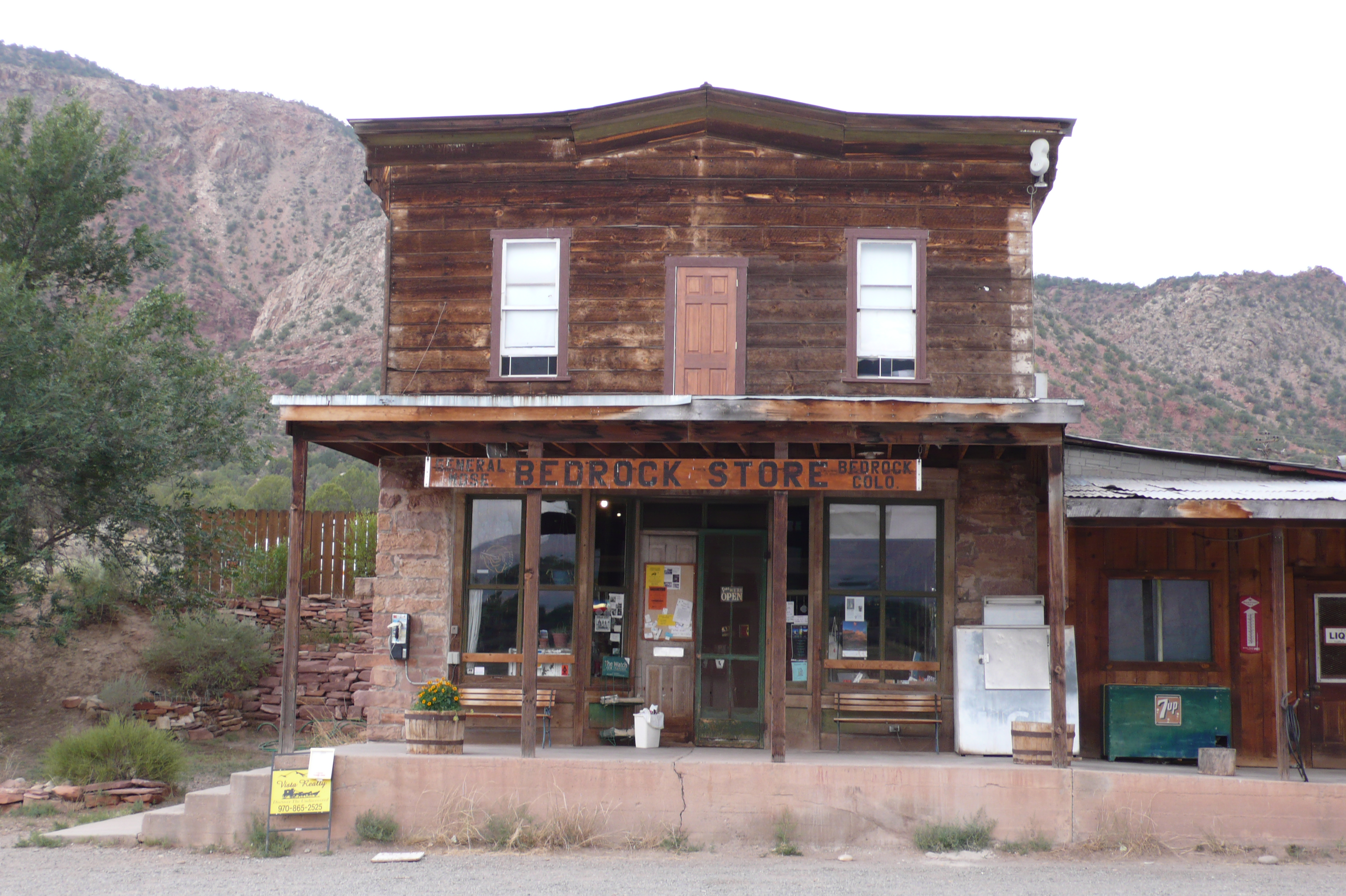
- Bedrock's general store

- Location of Bedrock, Colorado. Bedrock (Colorado)
- Coordinates: 38°18′54″N 108°53′27″W
- Country: United States
- State: Colorado
- County: Montrose
- Established: 1883

Government
  - Type: Unincorporated community
  - Body: Montrose County
- Elevation: 4,990 ft (1,520 m)
- Time zone: UTC−07:00 (MST)
  - Summer (DST): UTC−06:00 (MDT)
- ZIP Code: 81411
- GNIS pop ID: 185822

Bedrock is an unincorporated community and U.S. post office in western Montrose County, Colorado, United States.

== History ==
The town of Bedrock was established in 1883. The Bedrock post office opened on November 8, 1883. The town's general store and post office were built on solid rock, hence the name. The general store originally served the ranching community of Paradox Valley and later also served uranium miners in the 20th century.

The general store was built in 1882 and featured in the 1991 film Thelma & Louise.

== Geography ==
Bedrock is located in the southwest margin of Paradox Valley. The Dolores River enters the Paradox Valley approximately one quarter of a mile southeast of the community. Naturita lies 20 miles to the east along Colorado State Highway 90.

== See also ==
- Montrose, CO Micropolitan Statistical Area
