= Naturita, Colorado =

Town in Colorado, United States

- Town
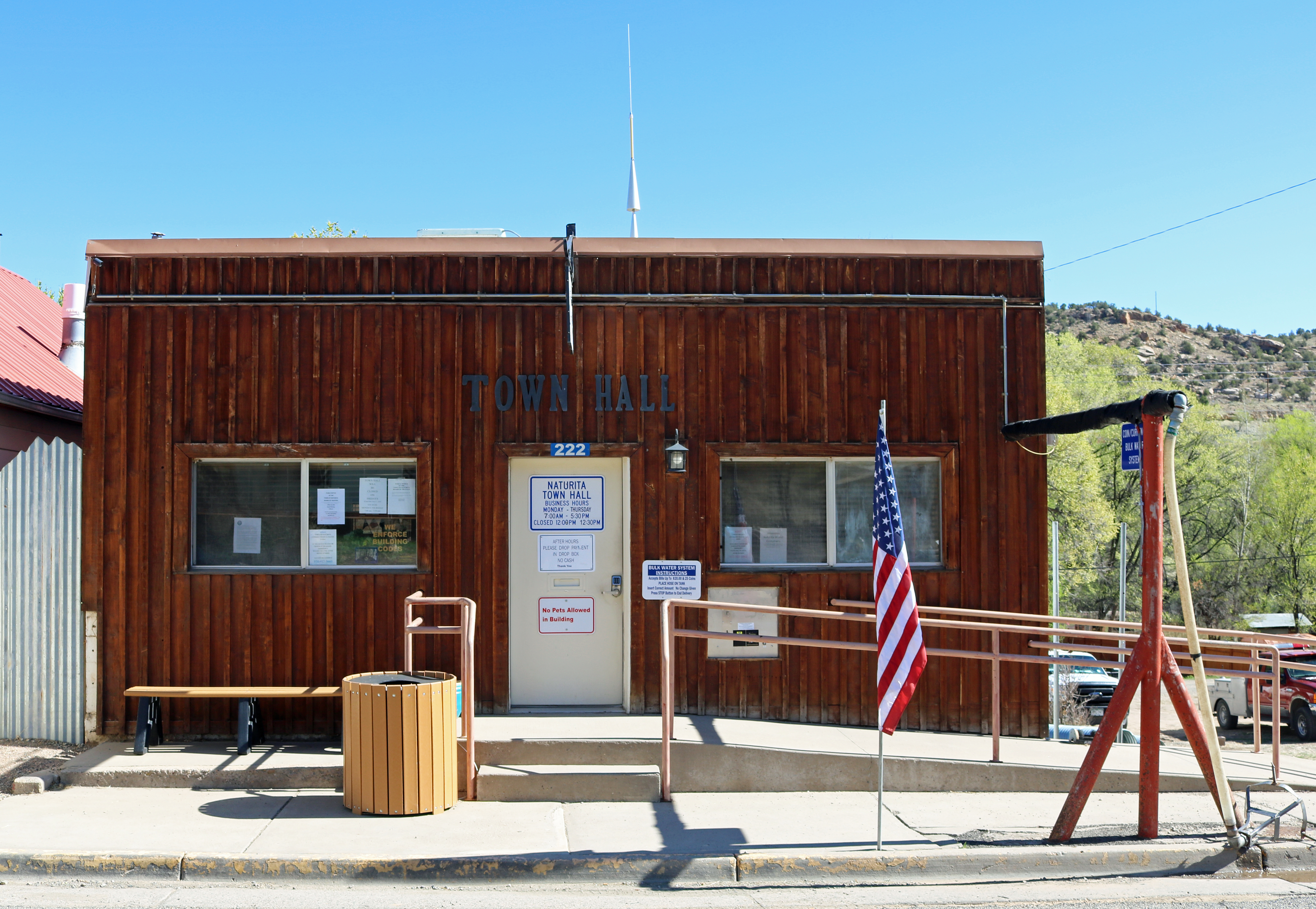
- Town Hall on East Main Street

- Location in Montrose County, Colorado
- Coordinates: 38°13′06″N 108°34′00″W
- Country: United States
- State: Colorado
- County: Montrose
- Incorporated (town): November 30, 1951

Government
  - Type: Statutory town

Area
  - Total: 0.615 sq mi (1.594 km^{2})
  - Land: 0.615 sq mi (1.594 km^{2})
  - Water: 0 sq mi (0.00 km^{2})
- Elevation: 5,397 ft (1,645 m)

Population (2020)
  - Total: 485
  - Density: 788.6/sq mi (304.5/km^{2})
- Time zone: UTC-7 (Mountain (MST))
  - Summer (DST): UTC-6 (MDT)
- ZIP code: 81422
- Area code: 970
- FIPS code: 08-53120
- GNIS feature ID: 2413035
- Website: townofnaturita.colorado.gov

Naturita is a statutory town in Montrose County, Colorado, United States. The population was 485 at the 2020 census, down from 546 in 2010.

The post office in Naturita was opened on October 21, 1881, under the name "Chipeta"; the name was changed to Naturita September 15, 1882, and has used that name since then. Naturita is a name derived from Spanish meaning "little nature".

== Geography ==
The community is located in southwest Montrose County within the San Miguel River valley. The community is served by Colorado State Highways 97 and 141. Telluride is 52 miles (84 km) to the southeast via Highways 141 and 145. Montrose, the Montrose county seat, is 41 miles (66 km) to the northeast in air distance across the Uncompahgre Plateau but 86 miles (138 km) by paved roads.

According to the United States Census Bureau, the town has a total area of 0.6 square miles (1.6 km^{2}), all of it land. The San Miguel River flows northwest from Naturita to the Dolores River, which continues northwest to the Colorado River in Utah.

=== Climate ===
The average low in January is 16 °F (−9 °C), while the average high in July rises to 96 °F (36 °C). The record low temperature for the town is −23 °F (−31 °C), while the hottest temperature recorded is 115 °F (46 °C)

== Demographics ==
Historical population
Census	Pop.	Note	%±
1960	979		—
1970	820		−16.2%
1980	819		−0.1%
1990	434		−47.0%
2000	635		46.3%
2010	546		−14.0%
2020	485		−11.2%
U.S. Decennial Census

As of the census of 2000, there were 635 people, 257 households, and 164 families residing in the town. The population density was 865.5 inhabitants per square mile (334.2/km^{2}). There were 314 housing units at an average density of 428.0 units per square mile (165.3 units/km^{2}). The racial makeup of the town was 93.70% White, 2.36% Native American, 0.16% Asian, 1.73% from other races, and 2.05% from two or more races. Hispanic or Latino of any race were 5.04% of the population.

There were 257 households, out of which 35.4% had children under the age of 18 living with them, 44.7% were married couples living together, 12.8% had a female householder with no husband present, and 35.8% were non-families. 28.4% of all households were made up of individuals, and 13.6% had someone living alone who was 65 years of age or older. The average household size was 2.46 and the average family size was 3.06.

In the town, the population was spread out, with 29.6% under the age of 18, 7.9% from 18 to 24, 27.2% from 25 to 44, 21.7% from 45 to 64, and 13.5% who were 65 years of age or older. The median age was 36 years. For every 100 females, there were 95.4 males. For every 100 females age 18 and over, there were 105.0 males.

The median income for a household in the town was $28,977, and the median income for a family was $37,917. Males had a median income of $33,203 versus $15,625 for females. The per capita income for the town was $13,867. About 3.8% of families and 10.0% of the population were below the poverty line, including 6.1% of those under age 18 and 11.8% of those age 65 or over.

== Amenities ==
Naturita has an inn, cafe, gas station, bank, grocery store, cannabis dispensary, and a few motels. To the west along Highway 90 in the community of Bedrock is the historic Bedrock Store, where scenes from movies such as Thelma & Louise were filmed.

== See also ==
- Montrose County, Colorado
  - Montrose, CO Micropolitan Statistical Area
