= Dolores River =

River in Colorado and Utah in the United States

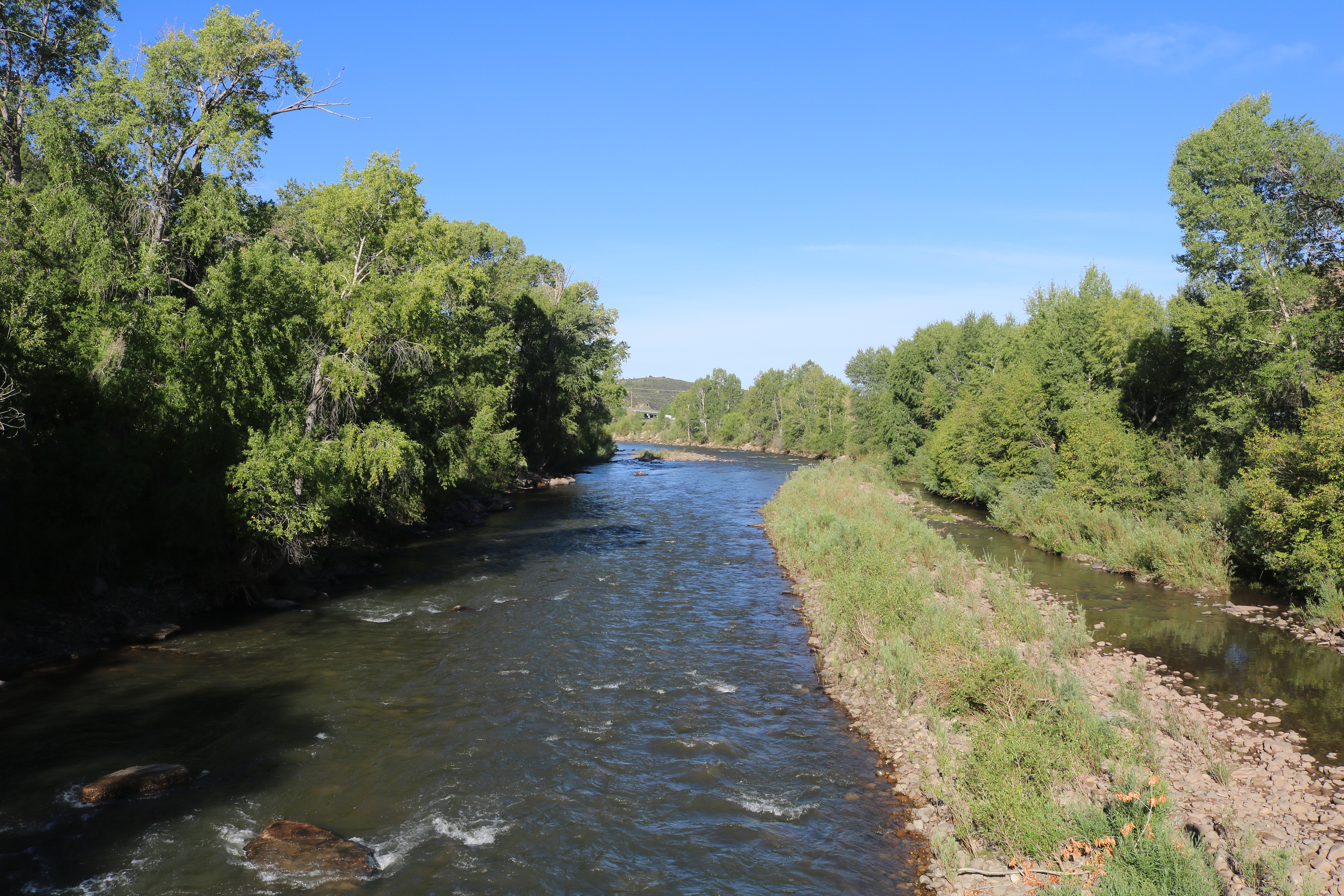
- The Dolores River in Dolores, Colorado.

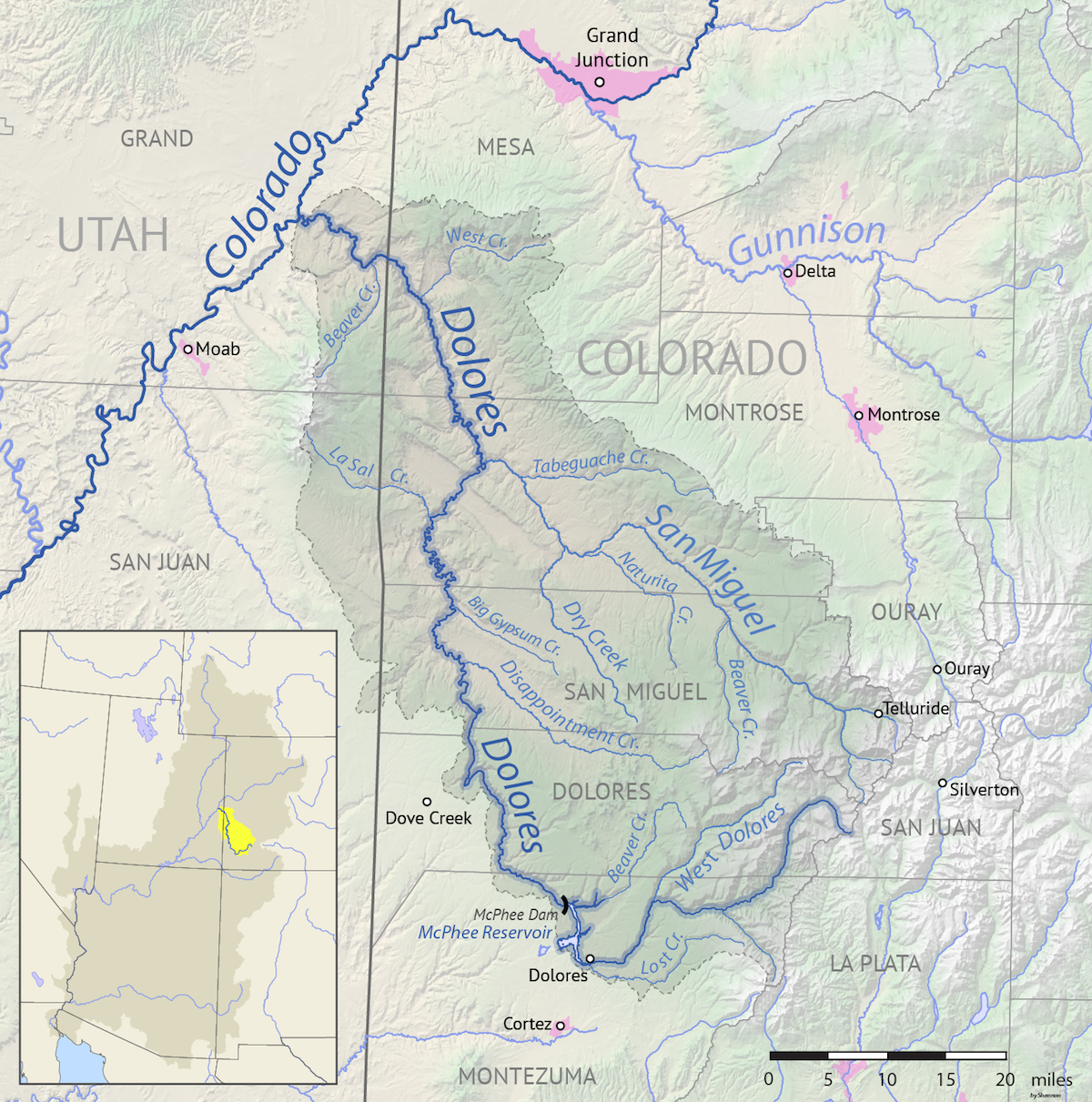
- The Dolores River watershed

Location
- Country: United States
- State: Colorado, Utah

Physical characteristics
- Source: San Juan National Forest
  - location: Montezuma County, Colorado
  - coordinates: 37°43′18″N 107°52′47″W
  - elevation: 11,650 ft (3,550 m)
- Mouth: Colorado River
  - location: Grand County, Utah
  - coordinates: 38°49′00″N 109°16′02″W
  - elevation: 4,390 ft (1,340 m)
- Length: 241 mi (388 km)
- Basin size: 4,574 sq mi (11,850 km^{2})
- Discharge
  - location: Cisco, UT, about 9 mi (14 km) from the mouth
  - average: 630 cu ft/s (18 m^{3}/s)
  - minimum: 1.5 cu ft/s (0.042 m^{3}/s)
  - maximum: 12,900 cu ft/s (370 m^{3}/s)

Basin features
- Tributaries
  - right: West Dolores River, San Miguel River (Colorado)

The Dolores River is a tributary of the Colorado River, approximately 241 miles (388 km) long, in the U.S. states of Colorado and Utah. The river drains a rugged and arid region of the Colorado Plateau west of the San Juan Mountains. Its name derives from the Spanish El Rio de Nuestra Señora de Dolores, River of Our Lady of Sorrows. The river was explored and possibly named by Juan Maria Antonio Rivera during a 1765 expedition from Santa Fe.

The mean annual flow of the Dolores prior to damming was approximately 1,200 cu ft/s (34 m^{3}/s), but due to diversions it has been reduced to about 600 cu ft/s (17 m^{3}/s).

== Course ==
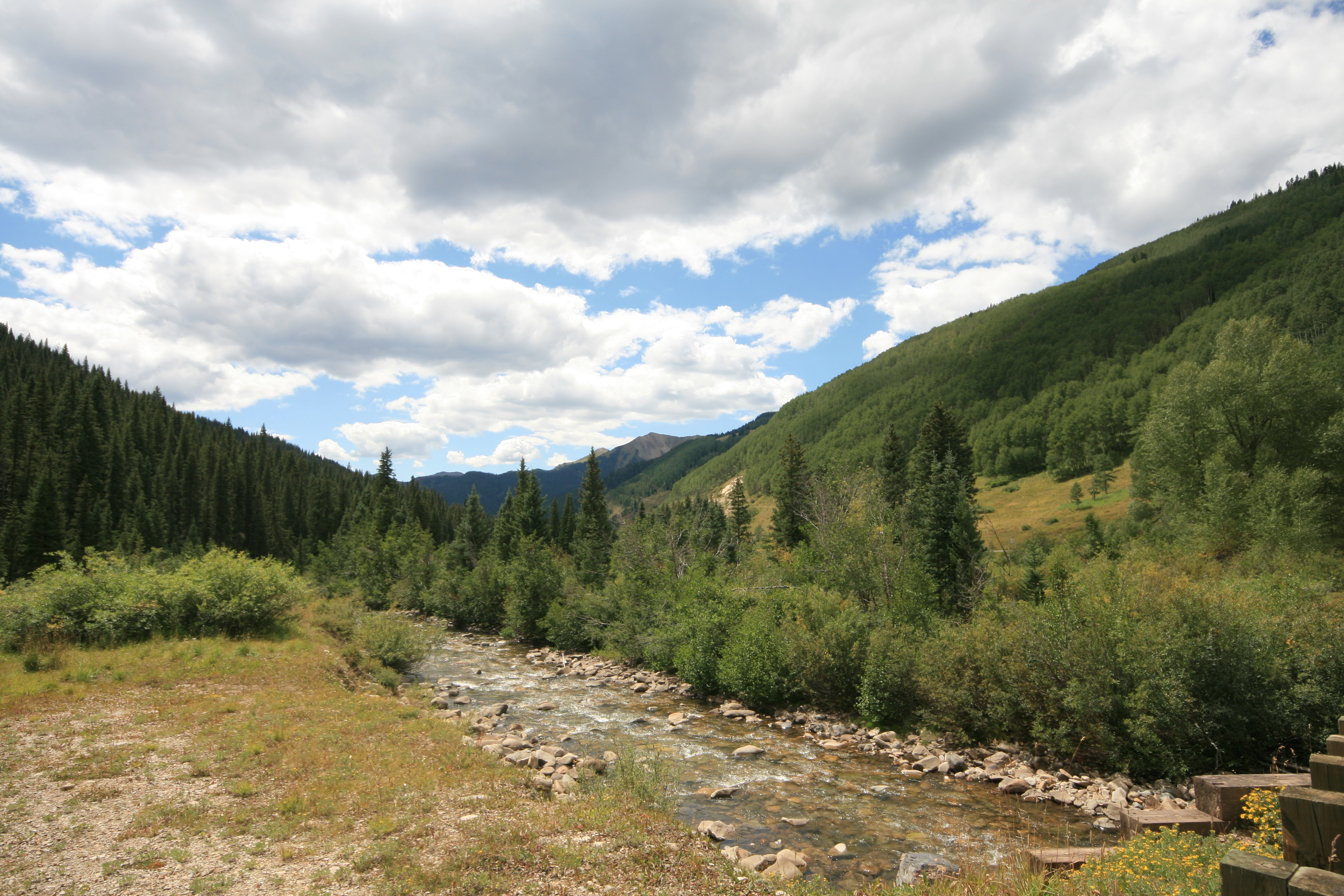
Headwaters of the Dolores River

The Dolores River rises in a meadow called Tin Can Basin, near 12,520-foot (3,820 m) Hermosa Peak in the San Miguel Mountains, in Dolores County, Colorado. The headwaters are located about 5 miles (8.0 km) south of Lizard Head Pass in the San Juan National Forest. The river flows southwest in a canyon past Rico, receiving the West Dolores River, then flows into McPhee Reservoir near Dolores in Montezuma County. Formed by McPhee Dam, the reservoir is about 10 miles (16 km) long and diverts flows of the upper Dolores River for irrigation.

Downstream from McPhee Dam, the river re-enters Dolores County and carves the Dolores River Canyon, which stretches north for over 40 miles (64 km) and averages 1,100 feet (340 m) deep. This section of the Dolores River is noted for its exposed sedimentary strata, desert wildlife, and during years of heavy snowmelt for its whitewater. Near Egnar the river crosses into San Miguel County and then from there into Montrose County.

Continuing north, the Dolores cuts across the Paradox Valley which runs in an unusual transverse direction to the river. Immediately below Paradox Valley it is joined by the San Miguel River, its main tributary, from the east. (Incidentally, the Dolores and San Miguel have their headwaters to either side of Lizard Head Pass.) Due to diversions on the main stem, the San Miguel is typically the same size as the Dolores if not larger, providing most of the flow below the confluence in dry years.

Below the confluence with the San Miguel, the Dolores enters Mesa County, flowing north-northwest past Gateway and then turning west into Utah. The last segment of the river, entirely within Grand County, joins the Colorado near the historic Dewey Bridge, about 30 miles (48 km) above Moab.

The Hanging Flume is located on the canyon wall near Uravan, Colorado.

== Discharge ==
Measured at Cisco, Utah, not far above the confluence with the Colorado River, the average unimpaired discharge of the Dolores River between 1906 and 1995 was 841,000 acre-feet (1.037 km^{3}), or about 1,160 cubic feet per second (33 m^{3}/s). The United States Geological Survey has operated a stream gage at Cisco from 1950 to the present. For the 36-year period December 1950 to September 1986, the river flow at Cisco averaged 845 cubic feet per second (23.9 m^{3}/s). By contrast, in the 27 years from October 1986 (the year McPhee Dam was completed) to October 2013, the river averaged only 599 cubic feet per second (17.0 m^{3}/s) due to the McPhee Dam diversions.

Measured at Bedrock, Colorado, at the entrance to Paradox Valley (above the San Miguel confluence) the effect of the flow reductions is more obvious, with an average of 504 cubic feet per second (14.3 m^{3}/s) before September 1984 as compared to 240 cubic feet per second (6.8 m^{3}/s) between October 1984 and May 2014.

== Geology ==
The ancestral Dolores River is believed to have flowed south to join the San Juan River near the Four Corners in what is now northwestern New Mexico. The uplift of Sleeping Ute Mountain about 70 million years ago diverted the Dolores River to its present northward course, causing it to carve the Dolores River Canyon on its way to the Colorado River, creating unusual geologic features such as the Paradox Valley. The Dolores Canyon exposes rocks ranging from 300-million-year-old Pennsylvanian limestone to the 140-million-year-old Entrada sandstone deposited during the Jurassic. A cap of Cretaceous Dakota sandstone forms most of the upper rim of the canyon. It also includes red Wingate Sandstone.

The lower Dolores River may have once been the original course of the Colorado River, which flowed through the now dry Unaweep Canyon, currently occupied by West Creek, a small tributary of the Dolores. When the Uncompahgre Plateau was formed, it diverted the larger Colorado northwards through what is now the Grand Valley, looping around through Westwater Canyon to the confluence with the Dolores in eastern Utah and leaving Unaweep Canyon as a huge dry gap across the plateau. However, some geologists contend that Colorado never flowed through Unaweep and the lower Dolores River, as the erosive force of the river should have created a water gap here; instead, the canyon may have been formed by glaciation during the Paleozoic.

== River modifications ==
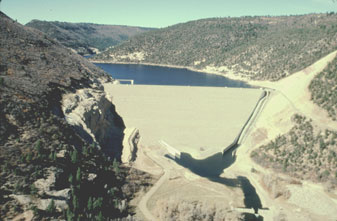
View of McPhee Dam and Reservoir, in Montezuma County, Colorado

The Dolores is dammed at McPhee Reservoir near Cortez, Colorado to irrigate about 61,660 acres (24,950 ha) of arid plateau land. The dam and diversion canals are operated by the Bureau of Reclamation as the Dolores Project. In some years, almost all the water entering the reservoir is diverted, leaving only a small legally mandated minimum flow to pass downstream, as a result reducing the 150 mile (242 km) stretch between the dam and the confluence of the San Miguel River to a large creek.

The dam's construction allowed local farmers to extend the irrigation season through September, whereas natural river flows would have been insufficient by July or August. While the dam has reduced and sometimes completely halted spring peak flows in the lower Dolores, it provides supplemental flows in late summer (August through October) in the range of 75 cubic feet per second (2.1 m^{3}/s), maintaining downstream fisheries. Before the dam was built, irrigators diverted nearly the entire river flow, leaving as little as 10 cubic feet per second (0.28 m^{3}/s) to flow downstream.

Releases from McPhee Dam are a controversial topic. Currently, the Bureau of Reclamation operates McPhee on a "fill, then spill" policy, where the dam is filled first, and only in high water years when inflows exceed the reservoir capacity are larger flows released. This fact aggrieves recreational boaters, who claim it is difficult for anyone but a local resident closely watching the gauges to plan trips in advance on the river. The San Juan Citizens' Alliance has worked to start a dialogue between Dolores River stakeholders in the hopes of shifting release policy to one that allows for greater, planned releases.

== Recreation and conservation ==
The Dolores is navigable by rafts and kayaks (up to class IV) from McPhee Reservoir to its confluence with Colorado. When water is restricted from the reservoir, it may be possible to boat downstream from the San Miguel River. However, the river is extensively used for irrigation and, during low water years, can be wholly unnavigable.

In high-runoff years, the section from Bradfield Ranch near Cahone, Colorado down to Slick Rock, Colorado, offers scenery, camping, and rapids for inflatables and kayaks. The section from Slickrock to Bedrock, Colorado goes through the goosenecks of a sandstone canyon with several mostly class II rapids. The Bureau of Land Management recommends minimum flows of 200 cubic feet per second (5.7 m^{3}/s) for canoes, kayaks, and inflatable kayaks, 800 cu ft/s (23 m^{3}/s) for small rafts of up to 14 feet (4.3 m), and 1,000 cu ft/s (28 m^{3}/s) for larger rafts of up to 18 feet (5.5 m) in size. The BLM does not require permits for groups running the river in Colorado, though permits are required from the Moab BLM office for boaters wishing to make the run from Gateway, CO, into Utah and to the confluence with the Colorado River near Dewey Bridge. In 2010, flash flooding altered Diversion Dam Rapid and Stateline Rapid on this section, making the latter very difficult to run in any vessel larger than a kayak.

Advocates have proposed establishment of a national monument encompassing 400,000 acres of the Dolores River Canyon and the surrounding region in Mesa and Montrose Counties. There are also proposals for a smaller 30,000-acre (12,000 ha) national conservation area in the northern portion (Mesa and Montrose Counties) and a 68,000-acre (28,000 ha) national conservation area and special management area in the southern portion (San Miguel, Dolores, and Montezuma Counties).

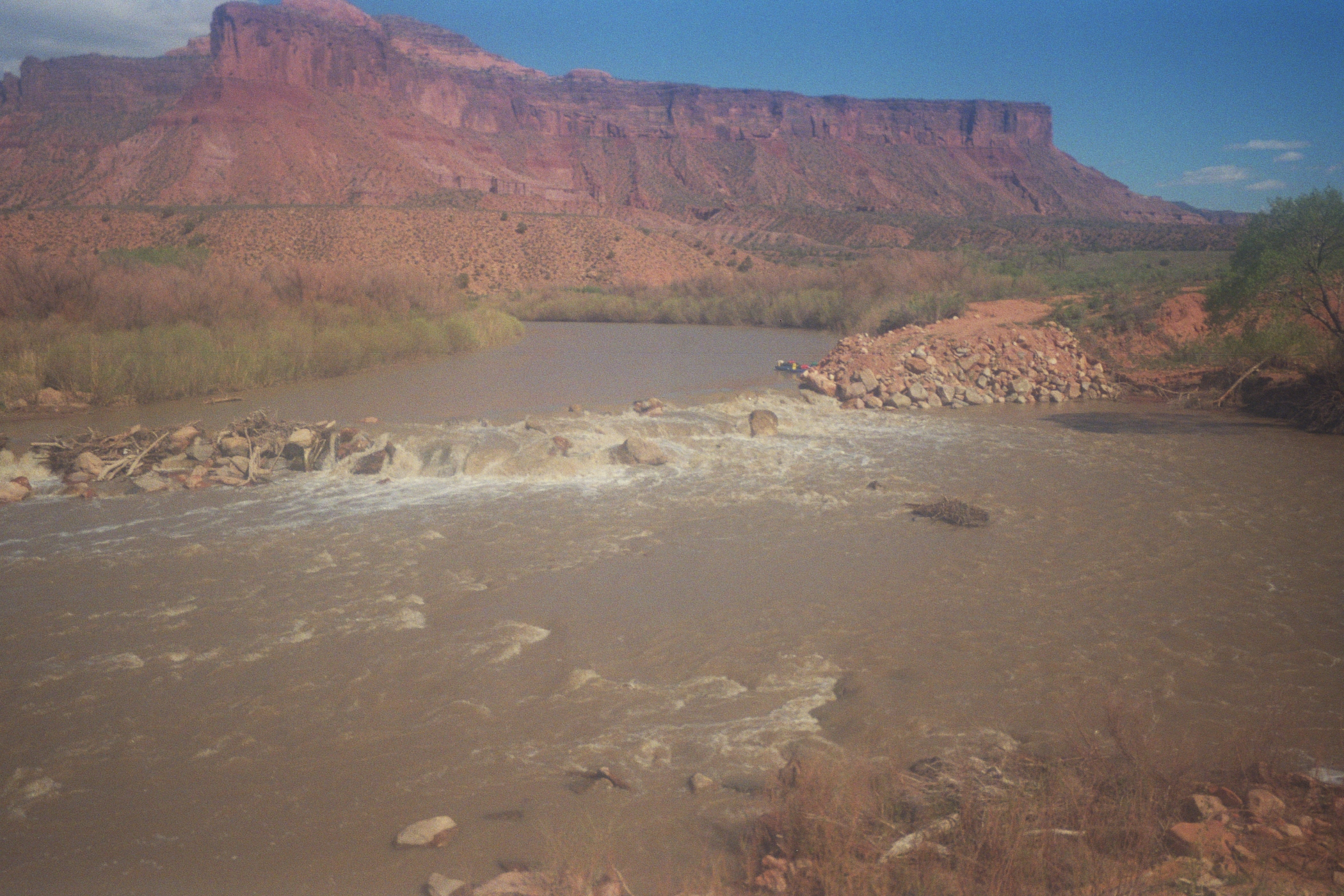
Diversion Dam Rapid in 2011 at 700 cfs

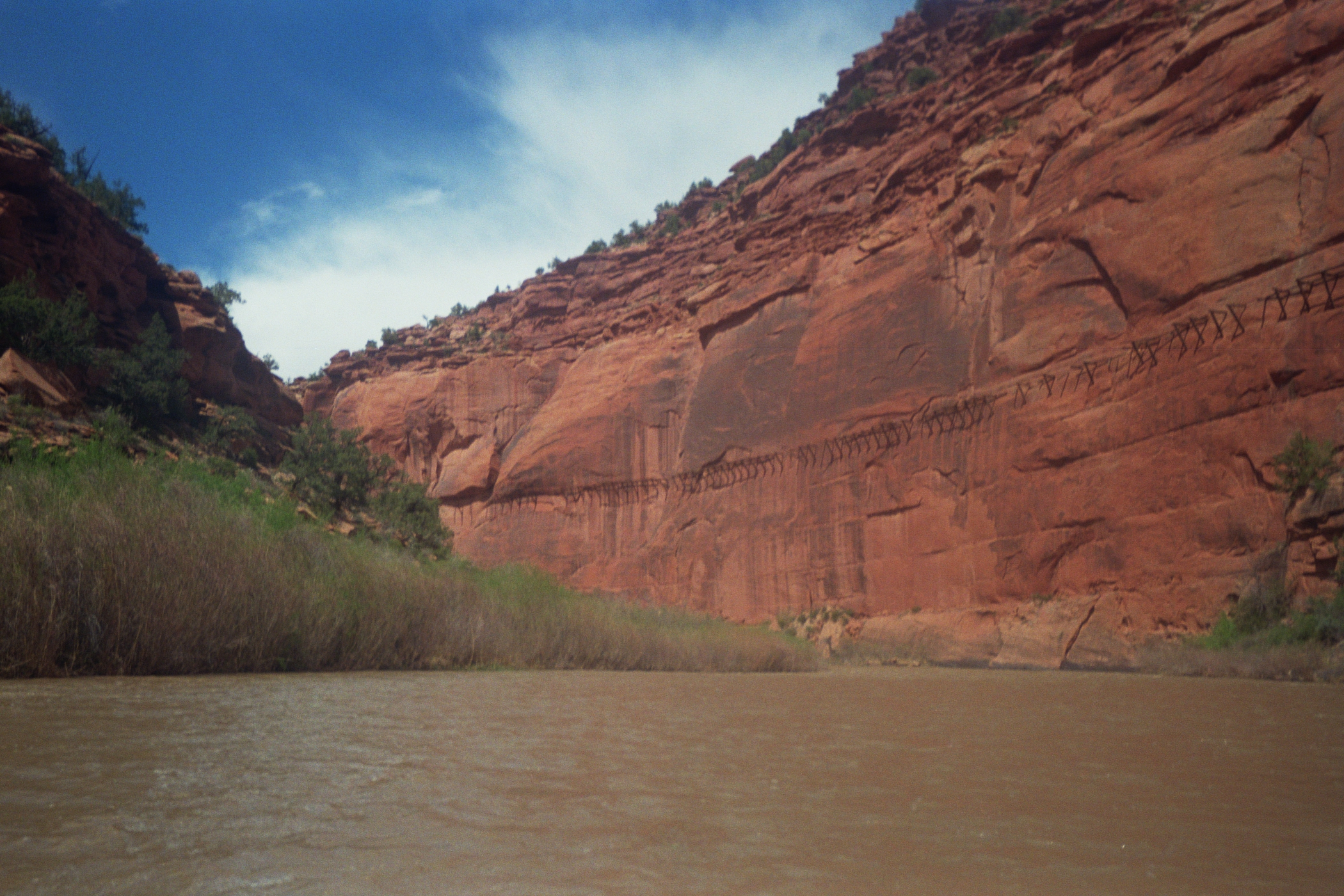
Historic hanging flume clings precariously to canyon walls

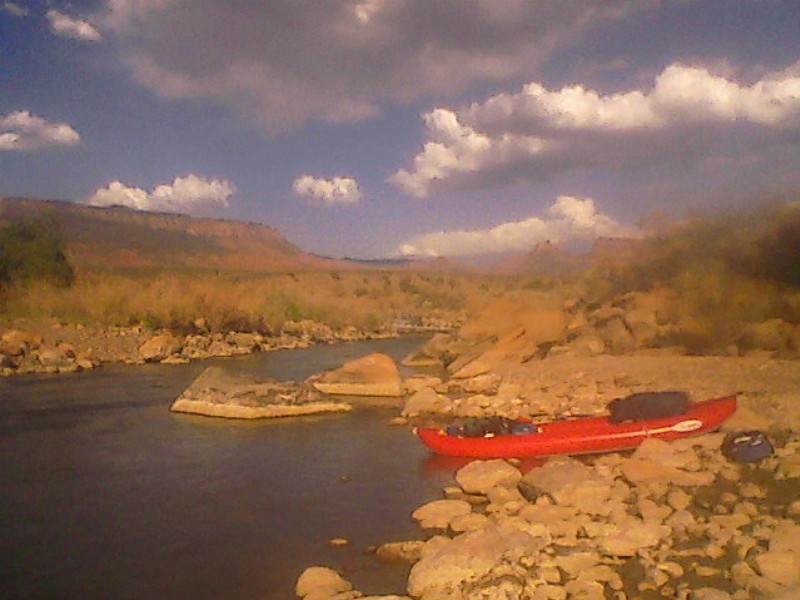
The Dolores river at low water, ~250 cfs

== See also ==
- List of rivers of Colorado
- List of rivers of Utah
- List of tributaries of the Colorado River
- Dolores River Bridge
