= National Register of Historic Places listings in Montezuma County, Colorado =

Location of Montezuma County in Colorado

This is a list of the National Register of Historic Places listings in Montezuma County, Colorado.

This is intended to be a complete list of the properties and districts on the National Register of Historic Places in Montezuma County, Colorado, United States. The locations of National Register properties and districts for which the latitude and longitude coordinates are included below, may be seen in an online map.

There are 41 properties and districts listed on the National Register in the county, including 2 National Historic Landmarks.

This National Park Service list is complete through NPS recent listings posted June 13, 2025.

== Current listings ==
	Name on the Register	Image	Date listed	Location	City or town	Description
1	Albert Porter Pueblo		March 18, 1999 (#99000266)	Address Restricted	Yellow Jacket	
2	Anasazi Archeological District		July 19, 1984 (#84001273)	Address Restricted	Dolores	
3	Archeological Site no. 5MT4700		June 11, 1999 (#99000685)	Address Restricted	Yellow Jacket	
4	Bass Site		June 11, 1999 (#99000654)	Address Restricted	Yellow Jacket	
5	Bauer Bank Block	Bauer Bank Block	October 11, 2003 (#03001009)	107 W. Grand Ave. 37°20′42″N 108°17′20″W	Mancos	
6	Cannonball Ruins	Cannonball Ruins	April 30, 1997 (#97000378)	Address Restricted	Cortez	
7	Chapin Mesa Village Historic District		December 20, 2024 (#100011176)	Chapin Mesa, Headquarters Loop Road; 37°15′34″N 108°29′40″W	Mesa Verde National Park	
8	Cortez High School	Cortez High School	March 22, 2016 (#16000098)	121 E. First St. 37°20′50″N 108°34′59″W	Cortez	Cortez' old high school, most recently Calkins Jr. High School.
9	Entrance Residence, Check Station Residence	Entrance Residence, Check Station Residence	March 14, 2025 (#100011177)	Park Entrance Road at junction with U.S. Highway 160; 37°20′24″N 108°24′44″W	Mesa Verde National Park	
10	Ertel Funeral Home	Ertel Funeral Home	November 7, 1995 (#95001248)	42 N. Market St. 37°20′58″N 108°35′03″W	Cortez	
11	Escalante Ruin	Escalante Ruin	November 20, 1975 (#75000527)	Address Restricted; 37°28′40″N 108°32′44″W	Dolores	
12	Exon & Rush Meat Market and Mercantile	Exon & Rush Meat Market and Mercantile	April 22, 2024 (#100009564)	315 Central Ave. 37°28′26″N 108°30′17″W	Dolores	
13	Haynie Site		November 13, 2017 (#100001792)	29619 Cty. Rd. L 37°22′41″N 108°30′15″W	Mancos vicinity	
14	Hovenweep National Monument	Hovenweep National Monument	October 15, 1966 (#66000250)	Northwest of Cortez; 37°26′35″N 108°58′56″W	Cortez	
15	Indian Camp Ranch Archeological District		March 28, 2012 (#12000145)	Address Restricted	Cortez vicinity	
16	Joe Ben Wheat Site Complex		January 16, 2004 (#03001383)	Address Restricted	Yellow Jacket	
17	James A. Lancaster Site		April 14, 1980 (#80000914)	Address Restricted	Pleasant View	
18	Lebanon School	Lebanon School	May 29, 1996 (#96000543)	24925 County Road T 37°27′28″N 108°35′29″W	Lebanon	
19	Lost Canyon Archeological District		October 18, 1988 (#88001909)	Address Restricted	Mancos	
20	Lowry Ruin	Lowry Ruin	October 15, 1966 (#66000253)	30 miles (48 km) northwest of Cortez via U.S. Route 160; 37°35′04″N 108°55′11″W	Pleasant View	
21	Mancos High School	Mancos High School	December 23, 1991 (#91001740)	350 Grand Ave. 37°20′44″N 108°17′32″W	Mancos	
22	Mancos Opera House	Mancos Opera House	January 7, 1988 (#87002183)	136 W. Grand Ave. 37°20′11″N 108°17′23″W	Mancos	
23	Mesa Verde Administrative District	Mesa Verde Administrative District	May 28, 1987 (#87001410)	Area at head of Spruce Canyon off park service road 37°11′03″N 108°29′18″W	Mesa Verde National Park	
24	Mesa Verde National Park	Mesa Verde National Park	October 15, 1966 (#66000251)	10 miles (16 km) east of Cortez on U.S. Route 160; 37°14′52″N 108°27′06″W	Cortez	
25	Mitchell Springs Archeological Site		November 9, 2001 (#01001207)	7755 Road 25; 37°19′30″N 108°35′44″W	Cortez	
26	Montezuma Valley Irrigation Company Flume No. 6	Montezuma Valley Irrigation Company Flume No. 6	March 27, 2012 (#12000146)	Approximately 4 miles (6.4 km) east of Cortez on US 160; 37°20′52″N 108°30′10″W	Cortez vicinity	
27	Montezuma Valley National Bank and Store Building	Montezuma Valley National Bank and Store Building	January 15, 2009 (#08001317)	2-8 Main St. 37°20′55″N 108°35′06″W	Cortez	
28	Mud Springs Pueblo		October 29, 1982 (#82001020)	Address Restricted	Cortez	
29	Painted Hand Pueblo		May 8, 2014 (#13000576)	Address Restricted	Pleasant View	
30	Park Point Fire Lookout	Park Point Fire Lookout	December 19, 2024 (#100011175)	Park Point Lookout Access Road at Mile Marker 10 off Main Park Road; 37°16′50″N 108°27′41″W	Mesa Verde National Park	
31	Pigge Site		April 7, 1980 (#80000915)	Address Restricted	Pleasant View	
32	Rock Springs Ranger Station		December 18, 2024 (#100011174)	Wetherill Mesa Road; 37°12′58″N 108°32′45″W	Mesa Verde National Park	
33	Roy's Ruin		January 31, 1992 (#91002027)	Address Restricted	Cortez	
34	Sand Canyon Archaeological District	Sand Canyon Archaeological District	March 15, 2005 (#05000138)	Address Restricted	Cortez	
35	Seven Towers Pueblo		June 11, 1999 (#99000653)	Address Restricted	Yellow Jacket	
36	Southern Hotel	Southern Hotel	February 23, 1989 (#89000018)	101 S. 5th St. 37°28′35″N 108°30′09″W	Dolores	
37	Ute Mountain Ute Mancos Canyon Historic District	Ute Mountain Ute Mancos Canyon Historic District	May 2, 1972 (#72000273)	Address Restricted	Durango	
38	Woods Canyon Pueblo		June 11, 1999 (#99000652)	Address Restricted	Yellow Jacket	
39	Wrightsman House	Wrightsman House	February 14, 1997 (#97000045)	209 Bauer Ave. 37°20′45″N 108°17′25″W	Mancos	
40	Yellowjacket Pueblo (5-MT-5)		September 28, 1985 (#85002701)	Address Restricted	Yellow Jacket	
41	Yucca House National Monument	Yucca House National Monument	October 15, 1966 (#66000252)	12 miles (19 km) south of Cortez via U.S. Route 666; 37°15′00″N 108°41′07″W	Cortez	

== See also ==
- List of National Historic Landmarks in Colorado
- List of National Register of Historic Places in Colorado
- Bibliography of Colorado
- Geography of Colorado
- History of Colorado
- Index of Colorado-related articles
- List of Colorado-related lists
- Outline of Colorado
