= Southern Hotel =

Southern Hotel may refer to:

in the United States

(by state)

- Southern Hotel (Perris, California), listed on the NRHP in California
- Southern Hotel (Dolores, Colorado), listed on the NRHP in Colorado
- Southern Hotel (Covington, Louisiana), on National Registry of the Historic Hotels of America
- Southern Hotel (St. Louis, Missouri)
- Southern Hotel (Joliet, Montana), listed on the NRHP in Montana
- Great Southern Hotel and Theatre, Columbus, OH, listed on the NRHP in Ohio
- Southern Hotel (El Reno, Oklahoma), listed on the NRHP in Oklahoma
- Columbia Southern Hotel, Shaniko, OR, listed on the NRHP in Oregon
- New Southern Hotel, Jackson, Tennessee, listed on the NRHP in Tennessee
- Southern Hotel (Llano, Texas), listed on the NRHP in Texas
