= KSJD =

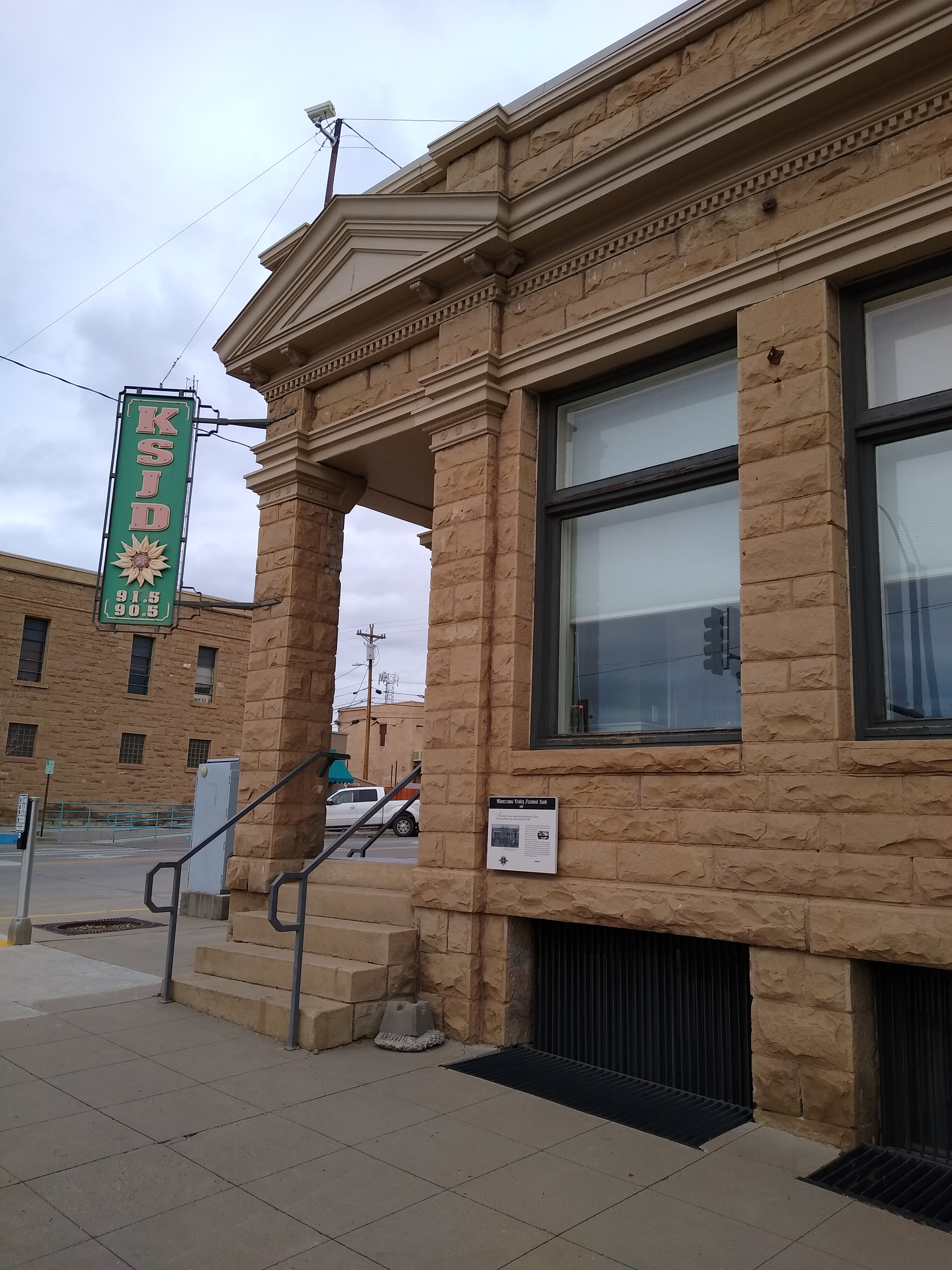
- Montezuma Valley National Bank building, home to KSJD
- Cortez, Colorado; United States
- Frequency: 91.5 MHz (HD Radio)

Programming
- Format: Public radio
- Affiliations: NPR

Ownership
- Owner: Community Radio Project

Technical information
- Licensing authority: FCC
- Facility ID: 58851
- Class: A
- ERP: 1,200 watts
- HAAT: 95 meters (312 ft)
- Transmitter coordinates: 37°28′57″N 108°30′34″W

Links
- Public license information: Public file; LMS
- Webcast: Listen live
- Website: ksjd.org

KSJD (91.5 FM), is a NPR-affiliated radio station licensed to Cortez, Colorado, United States. The station is currently owned by Community Radio Project.

== Translators ==
In addition to the main station, KSJD is relayed by an additional translator to widen its broadcast area. It is also digitally relayed to Rico, Colorado with an FM frequency of 89.5.

Call sign	Frequency	City of license	FID	ERP (W)	Class	FCC info
K216DA	91.1 FM	Dolores, Colorado	58853	90	D	LMS

== Location ==
The station is based in the historic Montezuma Valley National Bank building in Cortez, Colorado.

== See also ==
- List of community radio stations in the United States
