= National Register of Historic Places listings in Madison County, Tennessee =

Location of Madison County in Tennessee

This is a list of the National Register of Historic Places listings in Madison County, Tennessee.

This is intended to be a complete list of the properties and districts on the National Register of Historic Places in Madison County, Tennessee, United States. Latitude and longitude coordinates are provided for many National Register properties and districts; these locations may be seen together in a map.

There are 30 properties and districts listed on the National Register in the county, including 1 National Historic Landmark.

Contents: Counties in Tennessee
Anderson – Bedford – Benton – Bledsoe – Blount – Bradley – Campbell – Cannon – Carroll – Carter – Cheatham – Chester – Claiborne – Clay – Cocke – Coffee – Crockett – Cumberland – Davidson – Decatur – DeKalb – Dickson – Dyer – Fayette – Fentress – Franklin – Gibson – Giles – Grainger – Greene – Grundy – Hamblen – Hamilton – Hancock – Hardeman – Hardin – Hawkins – Haywood – Henderson – Henry – Hickman – Houston – Humphreys – Jackson – Jefferson – Johnson – Knox – Lake – Lauderdale – Lawrence – Lewis – Lincoln – Loudon – Macon – Madison – Marion – Marshall – Maury – McMinn – McNairy – Meigs – Monroe – Montgomery – Moore – Morgan – Obion – Overton – Perry – Pickett – Polk – Putnam – Rhea – Roane – Robertson – Rutherford – Scott – Sequatchie – Sevier – Shelby – Smith – Stewart – Sullivan – Sumner – Tipton – Trousdale – Unicoi – Union – Van Buren – Warren – Washington – Wayne – Weakley – White – Williamson – Wilson

This National Park Service list is complete through NPS recent listings posted December 12, 2025.

== Current listings ==
	Name on the Register	Image	Date listed	Location	City or town	Description
1	Anderson Presbyterian Church		March 15, 2007 (#07000157)	899 Steam Mill Ferry Rd. 35°33′42″N 88°52′22″W	Madison Hall	
2	Bemis Historic District		December 16, 1991 (#91001777)	Roughly bounded by D St., the Illinois Central railroad tracks, 6th St., and rural property lines to the west and south 35°34′23″N 88°49′31″W	Jackson	Includes the Bemis mill.
3	The Cedars	The Cedars	May 5, 1999 (#99000536)	260 Cotton Grove Rd. 35°37′57″N 88°45′03″W	Jackson	
4	Chevy Chase House and First Presbyterian Church Complex	Chevy Chase House and First Presbyterian Church Complex	November 20, 2015 (#15000834)	1573 N. Highland Ave. 35°38′29″N 88°49′42″W	Jackson	
5	Deberry-Hurt House		July 8, 1980 (#80003846)	Southwest of Jackson; 35°36′43″N 88°44′48″W	Jackson	
6	Denmark Mound Group		December 7, 1992 (#92001656)	Address Restricted	Denmark	
7	Denmark Presbyterian Church	Denmark Presbyterian Church	June 16, 1983 (#83003048)	Jackson-Denmark Rd. 35°31′56″N 89°00′01″W	Denmark	
8	East Main Street Historic District	East Main Street Historic District	July 3, 1980 (#80003847)	Irregular pattern along E. Main St. 35°36′50″N 88°48′35″W	Jackson	
9	Capt. H. P. Farrar House	Capt. H. P. Farrar House	April 15, 1982 (#82003989)	161 West Orleans St. 35°37′08″N 88°49′19″W	Jackson	
10	Greyhound Bus Station	Greyhound Bus Station	February 11, 1993 (#92001871)	407 E. Main St. 35°36′52″N 88°48′58″W	Jackson	
11	William Holland Jr. House	William Holland Jr. House	July 11, 2005 (#05000696)	215 Roland Ave. 35°38′05″N 88°49′14″W	Jackson	
12	Hollywood Cemetery	Hollywood Cemetery	May 22, 2003 (#03000430)	406 Hollywood Dr. 35°37′26″N 88°50′01″W	Jackson	
13	Illinois Central Railroad Division Office	Illinois Central Railroad Division Office	February 11, 1993 (#92001869)	245 W. Sycamore St. 35°36′43″N 88°49′21″W	Jackson	
14	Jackson Free Library	Jackson Free Library	June 26, 1975 (#75001769)	College and Church Sts. 35°36′58″N 88°49′01″W	Jackson	
15	Lane College Historic District	Lane College Historic District	July 2, 1987 (#87001117)	Lane Ave.; also an area including the president's house and Lane Ave. to the original district boundary 35°37′41″N 88°48′26″W	Jackson	Second set of boundaries represents a boundary increase of November 8, 1991
16	Madison County Courthouse	Madison County Courthouse	March 30, 1995 (#95000342)	Public Sq. 35°36′49″N 88°49′10″W	Jackson	
17	Mt. Olivet Cemetery		March 20, 2002 (#02000237)	E. Forest Ave. 35°38′10″N 88°48′29″W	Jackson	
18	Murphy Hotel	Murphy Hotel	February 11, 1993 (#92001872)	545 S. Royal St. 35°36′22″N 88°48′51″W	Jackson	
19	Nashville, Chattanooga & St. Louis Passenger Depot-Jackson	Nashville, Chattanooga & St. Louis Passenger Depot-Jackson	February 11, 1993 (#92001870)	590 S. Royal St. 35°36′20″N 88°48′47″W	Jackson	
20	New Southern Hotel	New Southern Hotel	November 21, 2002 (#02001378)	112-120 E. Baltimore St. 35°36′48″N 88°49′07″W	Jackson	
21	Northwood Avenue Historic District	Northwood Avenue Historic District	November 7, 1990 (#90001659)	1-38 Northwood Ave. 35°37′52″N 88°48′55″W	Jackson	
22	Oakslea Place	Oakslea Place	December 18, 2003 (#03001305)	1210 N. Highland Ave. 35°37′58″N 88°49′05″W	Jackson	
23	Pinson Mounds	Pinson Mounds	October 15, 1966 (#66000727)	460 Ozier Rd. 35°30′00″N 88°41′48″W	Pinson	
24	Riverside Cemetery		May 9, 2003 (#03000394)	300 Riverside Dr. 35°36′38″N 88°49′31″W	Jackson	
25	Ross-Sewell House	Ross-Sewell House	January 27, 1983 (#83003049)	909 Highland Ave. 35°37′42″N 88°49′08″W	Jackson	
26	St. Luke Episcopal Church	St. Luke Episcopal Church	May 24, 1984 (#84003600)	309 E. Baltimore St. 35°36′49″N 88°49′01″W	Jackson	
27	Southern Engine and Boiler Works	Southern Engine and Boiler Works	February 11, 1993 (#92001868)	342 N. Royal St. 35°37′05″N 88°48′46″W	Jackson	
28	Temple B'Nai Israel	Temple B'Nai Israel	July 16, 2008 (#08000687)	401 W. Grand St. 35°37′39″N 88°49′28″W	Jackson	
29	U.S. Post Office and Court House	U.S. Post Office and Court House	February 28, 2017 (#100000692)	109 S. Highland Ave. 35°36′50″N 88°49′11″W	Jackson	Now called the Ed Jones Federal Building and United States Courthouse.
30	William Kirby Walsh House	William Kirby Walsh House	December 10, 1993 (#93001374)	204 E. Deaderick St. 35°37′11″N 88°48′55″W	Jackson	

== Former listings ==
	Name on the Register	Image	Date listed	Date removed	Location	City or town	Description
1	Casey Jones Home and Railroad Museum		September 7, 1972 (#72001244)	December 31, 1980	211 W. Chester St.(Original location. Now located at:); 35°39′36″N 88°51′19″W	Jackson	Delisted due to relocation in October, 1980.

== See also ==
- List of National Historic Landmarks in Tennessee
- National Register of Historic Places listings in Tennessee
