= Murphy Hotel (Jackson, Tennessee) =

- U.S. National Register of Historic Places
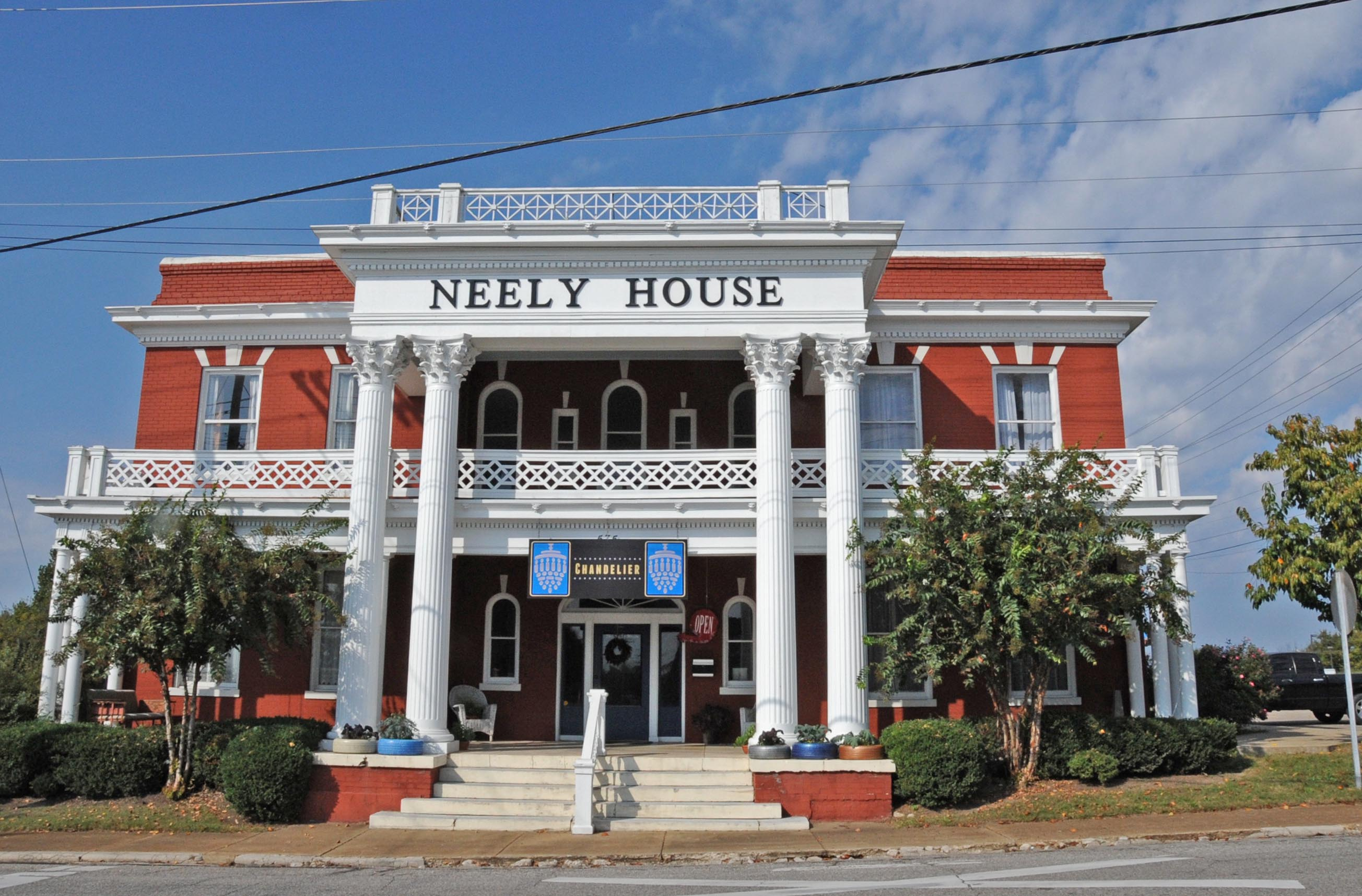
- The Murphy Hotel in 2015

- Location within Tennessee Location within the United States
- Location: 545 South Royal Street, Jackson, Tennessee
- Coordinates: 35°36′22″N 88°48′51″W
- Area: less than one acre
- Built: 1911
- Architectural style: Classical Revival
- MPS: Transportation-Related Properties of Jackson MPS
- NRHP reference No.: 92001872
- Added to NRHP: February 11, 1993

The Murphy Hotel, also known as the Neely House, is a historical hotel in Jackson, Tennessee, U.S. It was designed in the Neoclassical architectural style and is the city's only remaining railroad hotel erection. It has been listed on the National Register of Historic Places since February 11, 1993.

== History ==
The original hotel structure was constructed as early as 1900 by hotelier Franklin B. Neely and was known as the Neely House. After the completion of the Nashville, Chattanooga & St. Louis Passenger Depot in 1907, Neely promoted his business by meeting arriving trains and passing out coffee and sandwiches. By 1911, Neely's increased business allowed him to demolish his original two-story frame dwelling structure and build a new brick hotel that featured new amenities such as hot and cold running water in each room.

The hotel was operated by the Neely family until 1946, when it was sold to Robert J. Murphy, a farmer, who operated the business under the name The Murphy Hotel. After Robert J. Murphy died in 1960, his two daughters operated the hotel until its closing in 1997. It was then sold to the city with plans to turn the property into a children's museum. However, the city faced funding issues and the building fell into disrepair. In 2003, a tornado caused further damage to the building and completely destroyed its two-story front porch and deck. The damages led to the city choosing a different location for the museum. In 2005, Hal Crocker of Crocker Construction Company acquired the property and restored the building. It is now home to several businesses, including a restaurant.
