= Ross-Sewell House =

Historic house in Tennessee, United States

- U.S. National Register of Historic Places
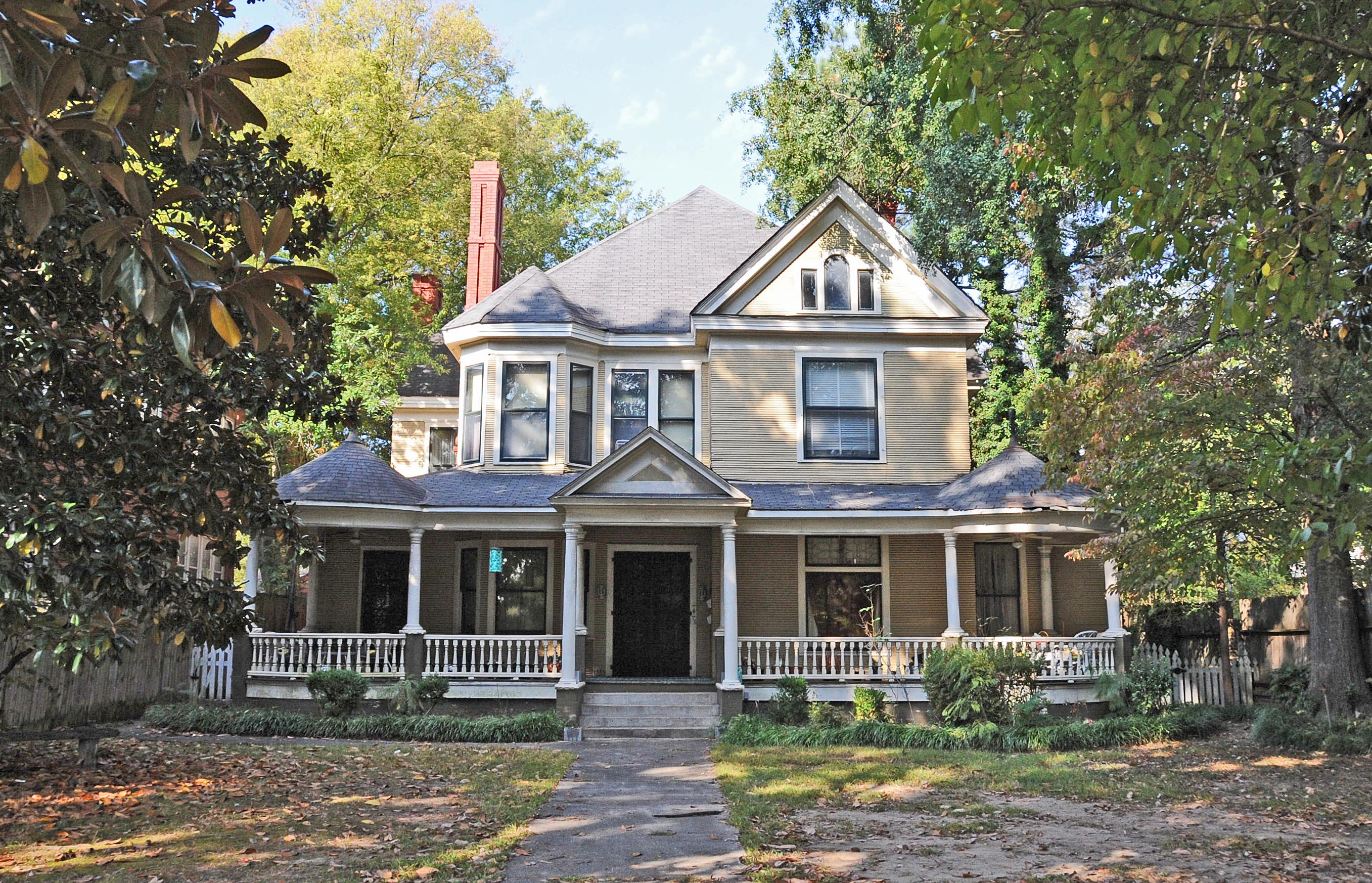

- Location within Tennessee Location within the United States
- Location: 909 Highland Avenue, Jackson, Tennessee, U.S.
- Coordinates: 35°37′43″N 88°49′10″W
- Built: c. 1904
- Architectural style: Queen Anne
- NRHP reference No.: 83003049
- Added to NRHP: January 27, 1983

The Ross-Sewell House is a house in Jackson, in the U.S. state of Tennessee.

== Location ==
The house is located at 909 Highland Avenue in Jackson, a city in Madison County, Tennessee, USA.

== History ==
The land was acquired by George E. Rauscher, a businessman from Erin, Tennessee, in 1904. Shortly after, he built this house. It was designed in the Queen Anne architectural style.

In 1920, the house was acquired by Judge John William Ross. After his death in 1925, the house was held in a trust owned by the Jackson Building and Savings Association. In 1934, it was purchased by Samuel Sewell. After his death in 1936, it was inherited by his widow, Floy.

== Architectural significance ==
It has been listed on the National Register of Historic Places since January 27, 1983.
