= Lebanon School =

- U.S. National Register of Historic Places
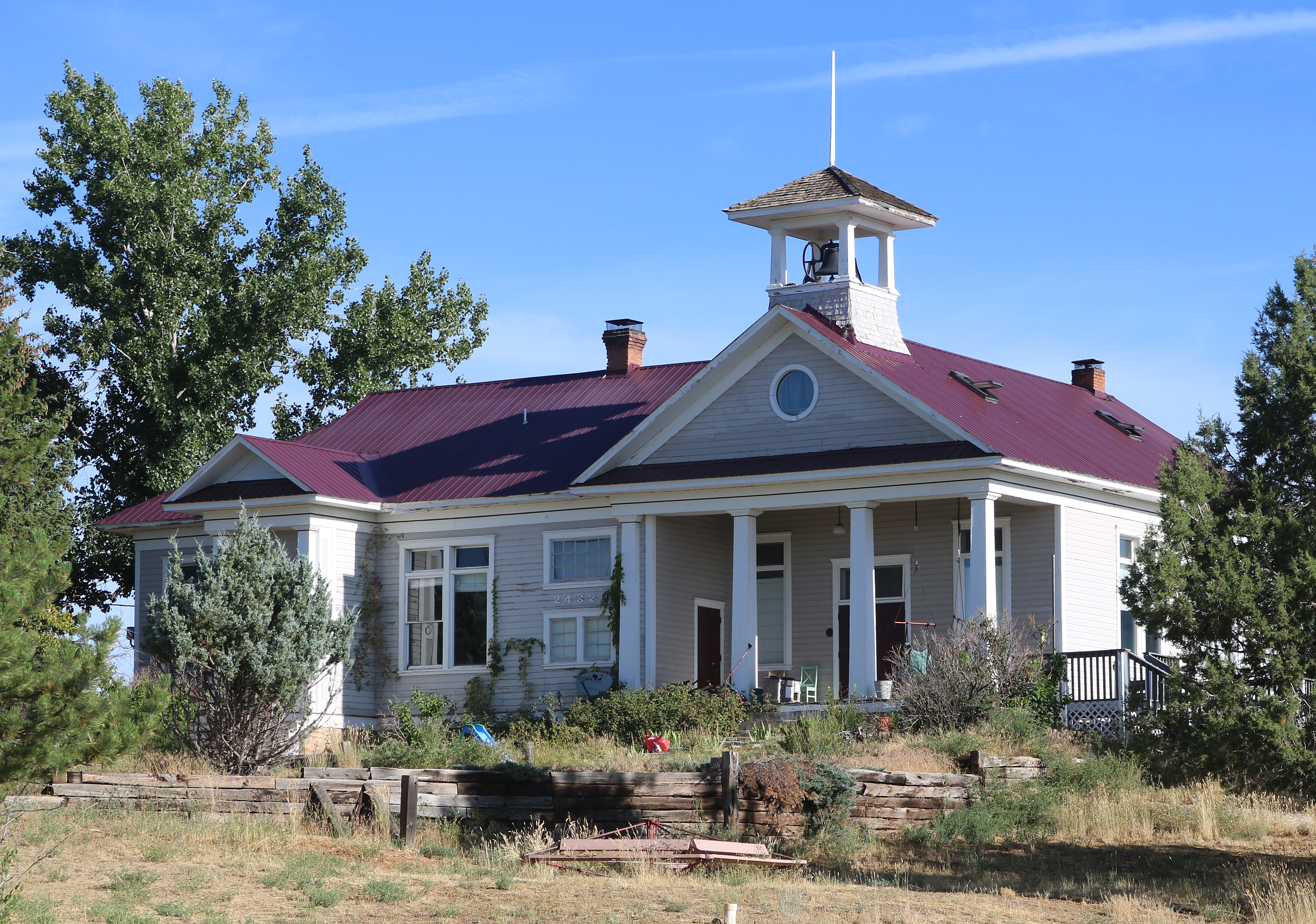
- The property in 2019.

- Location within Colorado
- Location: 24925 County Road T, Montezuma, near Dolores, Colorado
- Coordinates: 37°27′28″N 108°35′29″W
- Area: 2 acres (0.81 ha)
- Built: 1907
- Architectural style: Late 19th And 20th Century Revivals
- NRHP reference No.: 96000543
- Added to NRHP: May 29, 1996

The Lebanon School in the small community of Lebanon in Montezuma County, Colorado, about 8 miles (13 km) north of Cortez and in the general area of Dolores, was built in 1907 and expanded in 1916. It was listed on the National Register of Historic Places in 1996.

It is 62 by 43 feet (19 m × 13 m) in plan. The listing included two contributing buildings and a contributing structure.
