= William Kirby Walsh House =

Historic house in Tennessee, United States

- U.S. National Register of Historic Places
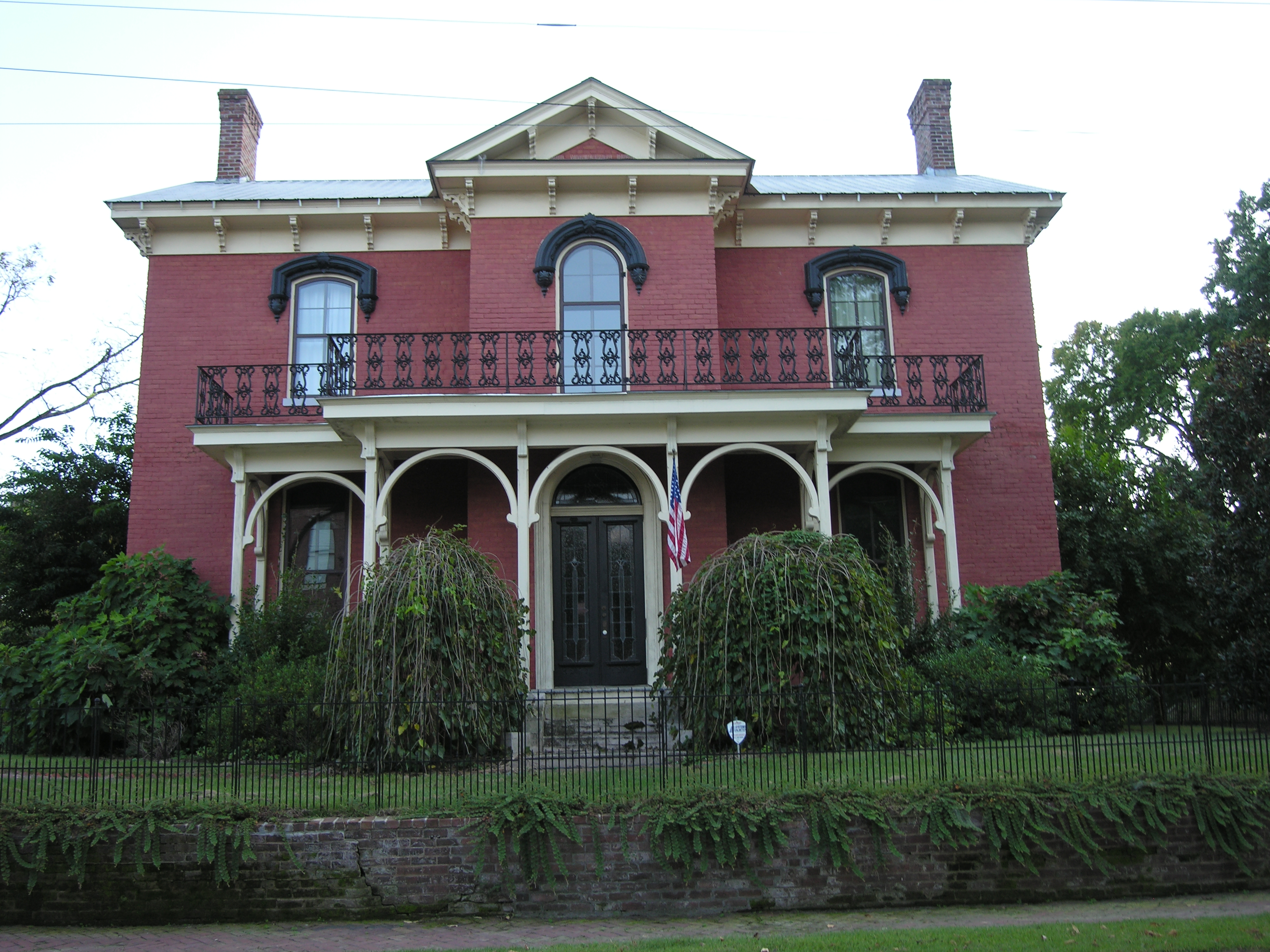
- The William Kirby Walsh House in 2014

- Location within Tennessee
- Location: 204 East Deaderick Street, Jackson, Tennessee
- Coordinates: 35°37′11″N 88°48′55″W
- Area: less than one acre
- Built: 1873
- Architectural style: Italianate
- NRHP reference No.: 93001374
- Added to NRHP: December 10, 1993

The William Kirby Walsh House is a historic house in Jackson, Tennessee, U.S.. It was built in 1873-1875 for William Kirby Walsh, a co-founder of the First National Bank of Jackson. It was inherited by his daughter Jennie, who lived here with her husband, Benton O. Sullivan, the part-owner of Sullivan, McCall & Co., a clothing business. The house remained in the Walsh-Sullivan family until Jennie's death in 1935, when it was remodelled into four separate apartments.

The house was designed in the Italianate architectural style. It has been listed on the National Register of Historic Places since September 10, 1993.
