= Oakslea Place =

Historic house in Tennessee, United States

- U.S. National Register of Historic Places
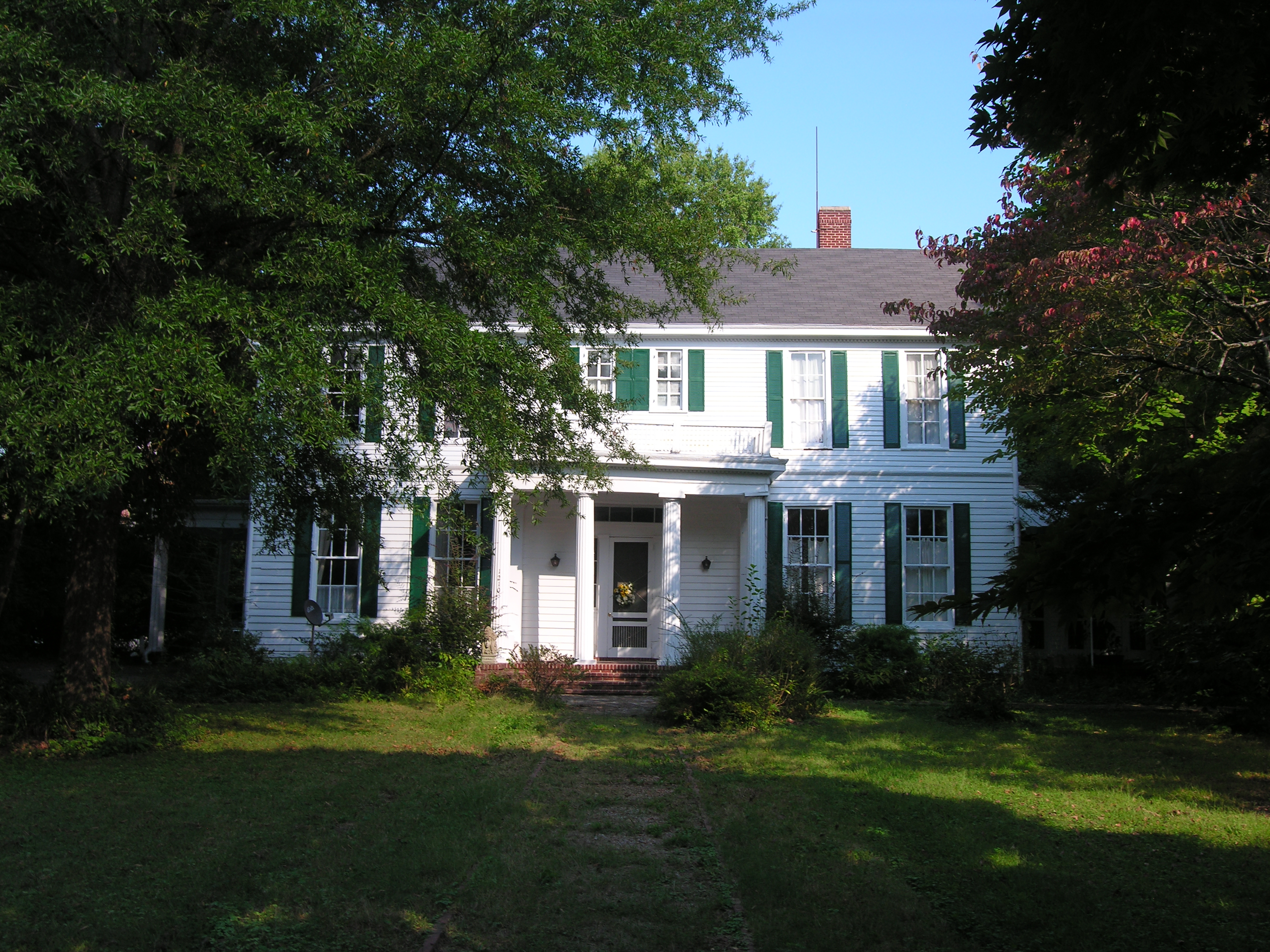
- Oakslea Place in 2014

- Location within Tennessee Location within the United States
- Location: 1210 North Highland Avenue, Jackson, Tennessee, U.S.
- Coordinates: 35°37′58″N 88°49′04″W
- Built: c. 1860; 1900
- Architectural style: Greek Revival; Colonial Revival
- NRHP reference No.: 03001305
- Added to NRHP: December 18, 2003

Oakslea Place is a historic mansion in Jackson, Tennessee, USA. Built circa 1860, prior to the American Civil War, it was expanded in 1900.

== Location ==
The mansion is located at 1210 North Highland Avenue in Jackson, a city in Madison County, Tennessee. It is close to the Forked Deer River, and halfway between Memphis and Nashville. Built in a rural area, it is now surrounded by many houses.

== History ==
The land belonged to Mathew Barrow in 1840. It was acquired by William East in 1849. In 1853, Judge John Read acquired the land.

The mansion was built circa 1860 for Judge John Read and his wife, Mary. It was designed in the Greek Revival architectural style. The portico is supported by four Doric columns.

After Judge Read died in 1865 at the end of the American Civil War, the mansion was inherited by his widow. She shared the house with her nephew and her niece.

The mansion was acquired by R.V. Hicks, a large landowner in Madison County, in 1899. A year later, in 1900, he built a second storey. It was designed in the Colonial Revival architectural style.

By 1911, the mansion was acquired by J.D. Hoppers. Three years later, in 1914, it was purchased by Thomas Polk. By 1917, it was sold to Dr. Jere Crook and his wife, Millian. They added a coal furnace in the basement with radiators throughout the house for central heating. By 1950, it was changed for gas heating. That year, they also built a sunroom. Until 1950, the grounds included chickens and two cows. In 1952, much of the garden behind the house was given to Dr. Crook's son, Dr. William Crook, to build a home for his family.

The mansion was acquired by Walton Harrison and his wife, Katherine, in 1958. By 2004, it was purchased by Richard Testani, who turned it into a bed and breakfast. According to Testani, the house is haunted by ghosts of former residents and servants.

== Architectural significance ==
It has been listed on the National Register of Historic Places since December 18, 2003.
