= Deberry-Hurt House =

- U.S. National Register of Historic Places
- Location within Tennessee Location within the United States
- Nearest city: Jackson, Tennessee
- Coordinates: 35°36′43″N 88°44′48″W
- Area: 8.4 acres (3.4 ha)
- Built: 1823
- Architectural style: Federal
- NRHP reference No.: 80003846
- Added to NRHP: July 8, 1980

The Deberry-Hurt House is a historic house in Madison County, Tennessee, U.S.. It was built for Mathias Deberry in 1823. It was expanded by his son-in-law, Robert B. Hurt, in 1855. By 1922, it belonged to Hurt's granddaughter, Elizabeth Hurt Leeper.

The house was designed in the Federal architectural style. It has been listed on the National Register of Historic Places since July 8, 1980.
