= The Cedars (Jackson, Tennessee) =

Historic house in Tennessee, United States

- Cedars, The
- U.S. National Register of Historic Places
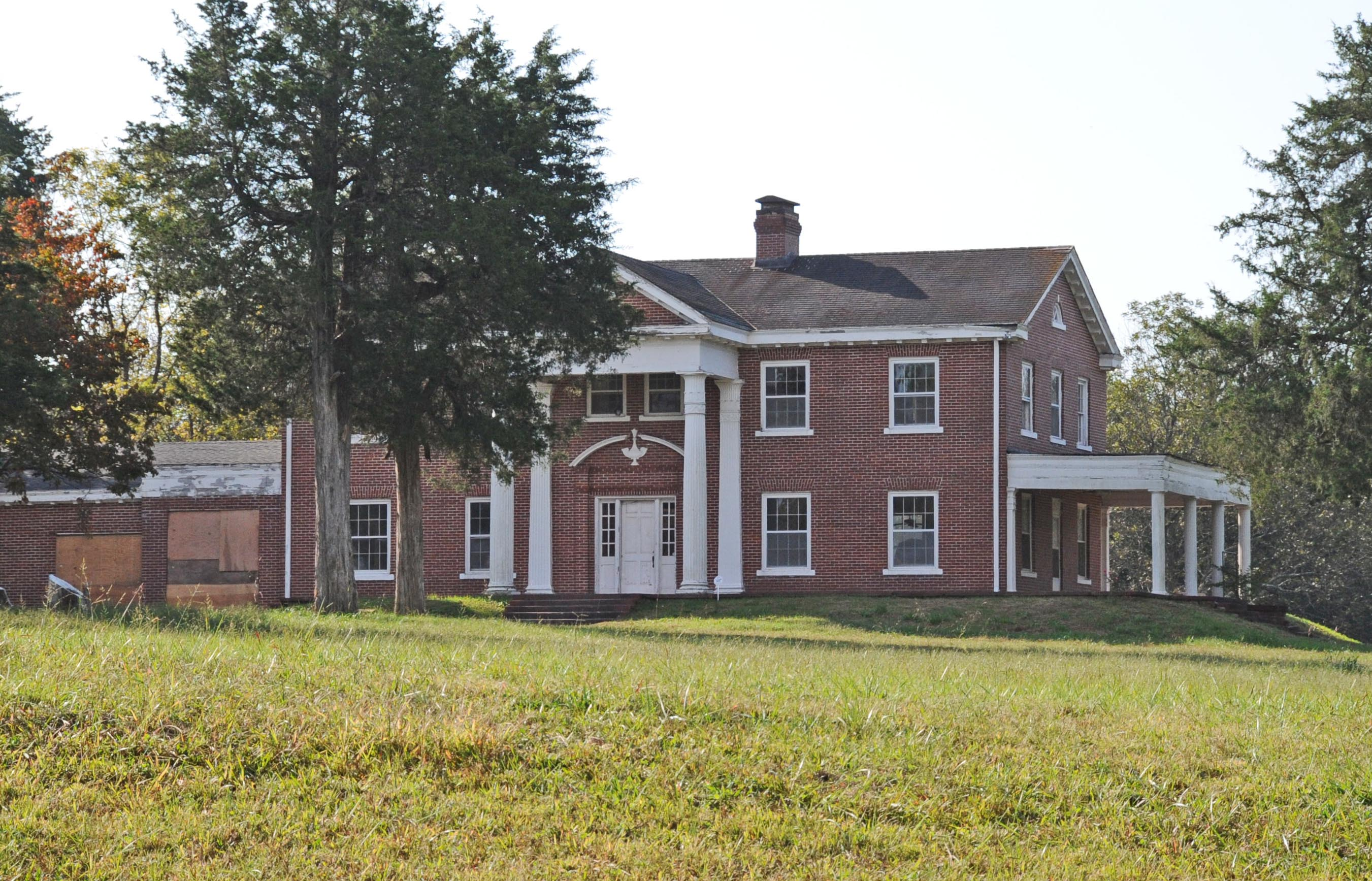
- The Cedars in 2015

- Location within Tennessee Location within the United States
- Nearest city: Jackson, Tennessee
- Coordinates: 35°38′1″N 88°45′5″W
- Area: 10 acres (4.0 ha)
- Built: 1930
- Architectural style: Colonial Revival
- NRHP reference No.: 99000536
- Added to NRHP: May 5, 1999

The Cedars, also known as the Collier-Callahan House, is a historic mansion in Jackson, Tennessee, United States. It was built in 1930 for William Collier after Adam Huntsman's old house burnt down.

The house was designed in the Colonial Revival architectural style. It has been listed on the National Register of Historic Places since May 5, 1999.
