= J.W. Ross =

J.W. Ross can refer to:

- Jeanne W. Ross (born ca. 1958), American organizational theorist
- John William Ross (1878–1925), United States federal judge
