= Bemis Historic District =

Historic district in Tennessee, United States

- U.S. National Register of Historic Places
- U.S. Historic district
- Location within Tennessee Location within the United States
- Location: Roughly bounded by D St., the Illinois Central Gulf RR tracks, Sixth St. and rural property lines to the W and S, Jackson, Tennessee
- Coordinates: 35.574°N 88.8212°W
- Area: 450 acres (180 ha)
- Built: 1900
- Architect: Multiple
- Architectural style: Bungalow/Craftsman, Mission/Spanish Revival, Dutch Colonial Revival, Other
- NRHP reference No.: 91001777
- Added to NRHP: December 16, 1991

Bemis Historic District, in Bemis, Tennessee and Jackson, Tennessee, is a historic district that was listed on the National Register of Historic Places in 1991. It includes Bungalow/Craftsman, Mission/Spanish Revival, Dutch Colonial Revival and other architecture. The listing included 511 contributing buildings, three contributing sites, eight contributing structures, and one contributing object on 450 acres (180 ha).

The district was a planned community developed within the southern part of the city of Jackson, Tennessee that was a company town for Bemis Industries.
