= New Southern Hotel =

- U.S. National Register of Historic Places
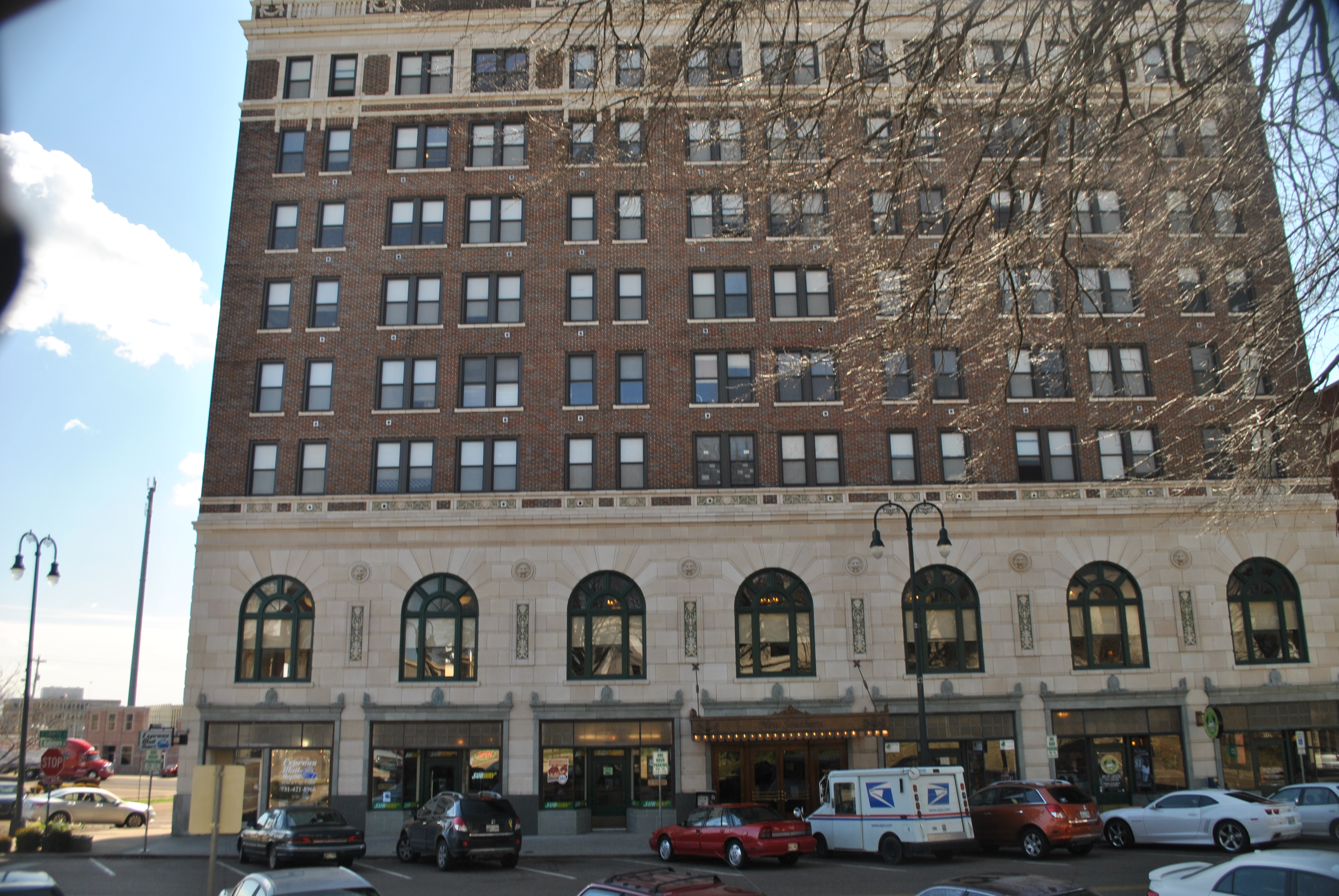

- Location within Tennessee Location within the United States
- Location: 112-120 East Baltimore Street, Jackson, Tennessee, U.S.
- Coordinates: 35°36′47.52″N 88°49′06.96″W
- Area: less than one acre
- Built: 1927
- Built by: B. E. Buffaloe Construction Company
- Architect: Reuben A. Heavner
- Architectural style: Renaissance Revival
- Restored by: Crocker Construction Company
- NRHP reference No.: 02001378
- Added to NRHP: November 21, 2002

The New Southern Hotel is a historical hotel in Jackson, Tennessee, USA.

== Location ==
The hotel is located at 112-120 East Baltimore Street in Jackson, a city in Madison County, Tennessee, USA.

== History ==
The site of the hotel once served as headquarters for Colonel Carroll Marsh of the 11th Illinois Regiment during the city of Jackson's Union occupation. By 1870, the house that stood there, known as the Trimmer House, was used as a hotel. In 1884, it was sold to Mrs. J. H. Day. She was responsible for expanding the hotel into a three-story building of Italianate and Queen Anne style, which included the addition of a three-story wing to the rear. The hotel's size and location made it the premier hotel during this time. Day operated the hotel until her death in 1914.

By 1928, hoteliers A.D Noe and Son, investor Ira Krupnick, and hotel developers Albert Pick & Co. recognized the city's growing need for high-quality business-class lodging and constructed a new hotel, deemed the New Southern, on the site. The hotel offered a central location in Courthouse Square and spaces for businessmen to entertain prospective clients. It featured a dining room, multiple ballrooms, men's and ladies' parlors, and a coffee shop. As the most luxurious hotel between Nashville and Memphis, it soon became an entertainment hub for politicians, local service clubs, and various organizations. It was known to host political rallies, fraternal conventions, academic conferences, weddings, proms, and retirement parties.

During the 1950s and 1960s, automobile culture and roadside motels grew in popularity, causing the New Southern's business, which relied on railroad travel, to decline. In 1970, the hotel closed and was converted into office spaces, which proved unsuccessful. In 1976, the New Southern underwent major renovations to turn its upper floors into a residential center for senior citizens. At this time, many of the plaster ceilings and original finishes were preserved behind the new additions and are awaiting future restoration.

On May 4, 2003, a tornado damaged the building, and it was restored by Crocker Construction Co. for the next two years.

== Architectural Significance ==
The New Southern was designed by architect Reuben A. Heavner, who is also known for his work on the main hall of Lane College. Its exterior is in the Renaissance Revival style with a facade that features terra cotta details, festoons, and arched window transoms. The interior of the building is designed in an eclectic style with Mediterranean Revival influences. Its lobby features leather-brown grid oak paneling. Throughout the building, there are complex plaster strapwork ceilings and ogee archways. It has been listed on the National Register of Historic Places since November 21, 2002.

== Popular culture ==
A music video for the song "Stella" by Hunter Cross was filmed at the hotel.
