= Mancos Opera House =

- U.S. National Register of Historic Places
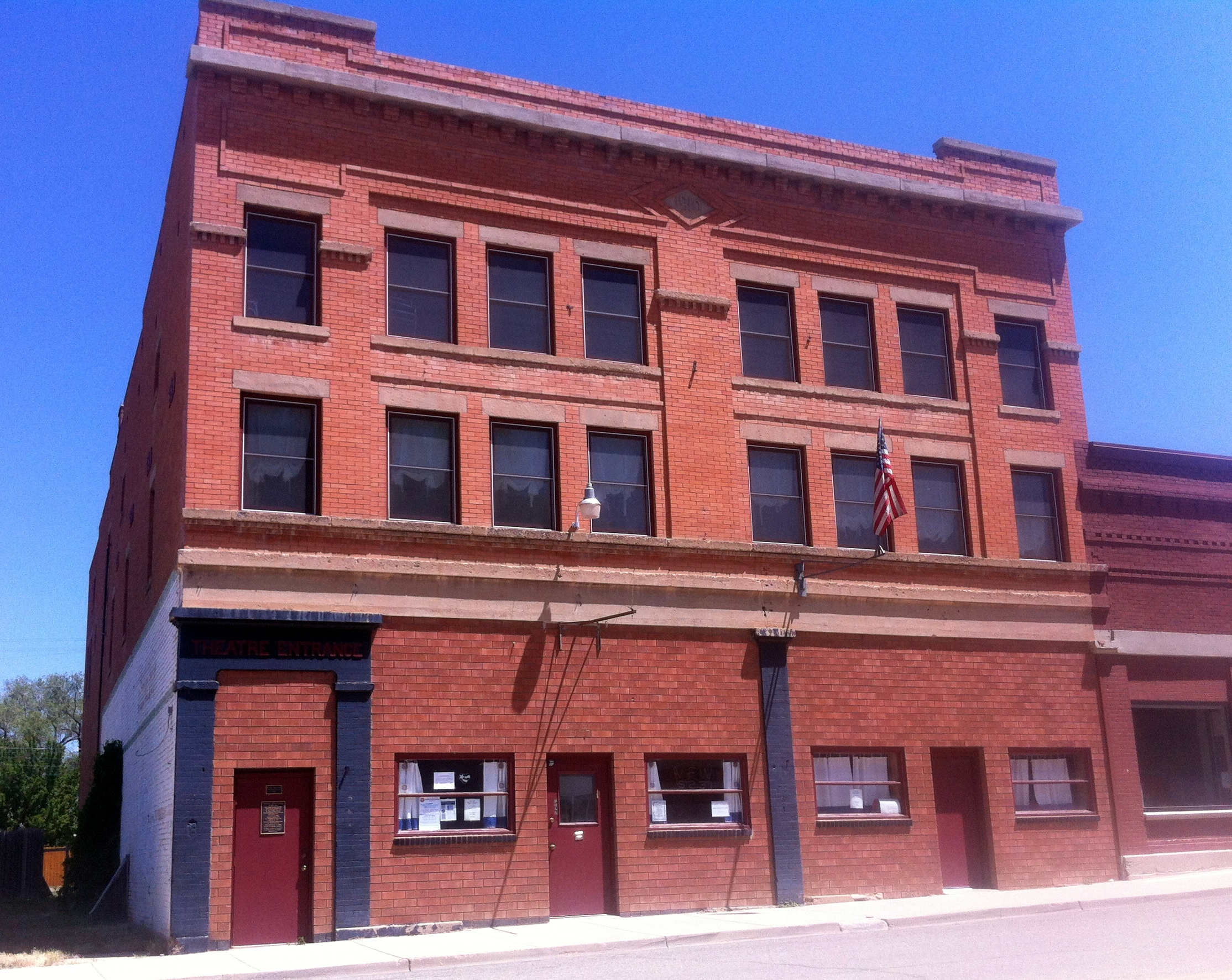

- Location within Colorado Location within the United States
- Location: 136 W. Grand Ave., Mancos, Colorado
- Coordinates: 37°20′11″N 108°17′23″W
- Area: 0.2 acres (0.081 ha)
- Built: 1910
- Built by: A. J. Ames, George Woods
- Architectural style: Twentieth Century Commercial
- NRHP reference No.: 87002183
- Added to NRHP: January 7, 1988

The Mancos Opera House, at 136 W. Grand Ave. in Mancos, Colorado, was built in 1910. It was listed on the National Register of Historic Places in 1988. It has also been known as Checkerboard Hall.

It is a three-story building which was built and owned by A.J. Ames and George Woods. It is prominent on Grand Avenue, the main street of Mancos. It and the Bauer Bank Building, also NRHP-listed, "are among the largest, intact commercial buildings in Mancos and in Montezuma County.

On March 10, 1910, A.J. Ames and George D. Woods announced in the Mancos Times and Tribune (the "Times") their intention to build the Mancos Opera House Block to house Woods’ drug store and the Mancos Meat and Grocery Co. on the ground floor, with an Opera Hall on the second floor. Ames and Woods engaged architect W.L. Morse to design the building. W.L. Morse and George Bauer were hired as the contractors for the construction.

On June 3, 1910, Woods and Ames announced in the Times that they intended to construct the building out of locally produced brick to “keep the money at home." On July 29, the Times reported that the brick kiln had been completed, and that 200,000 bricks would be fired. Of those, 100,000 of which would be used for the Opera House, the rest to be used in other projects. By November 11, 1910, the building had progressed to the point that George Woods printed an announcement in the Times that his drug store would hold its opening on Thanksgiving Day, November 24, 1910 and welcomed the town to the “Big Surprise Party." On December 10, 1910, the Times reported that the auditorium level of the building had been finished, Montezuma County’s first moving picture machine installed, curtains hung, and all was ready for use. On December 16, 1910, The Mancos Meat Grocery Co., Theodore Parker, Proprietor, advertised that they were “Dealer in all kinds of fresh and cured meats, Fruit, Farm Produce, Butter, Eggs, etc.”

For many years high school graduations were held in the hall as well as traveling road shows and square dances. The first moving picture show in Montezuma County was shown in the opera house and in the 1920s, silent movies were held on Saturday nights. After the movie, the ushers removed the seats and a public dance was held. The hall became known as the "Checkerboard Ballroom" because of the checkerboard pattern painted on the floor with numbers in the center of the squares. At the public dances, when the band stopped playing, a number was called and the couple standing on that number won a prize. The music for the dances was usually furnished by local musicians such as the six member Goff family orchestra or the band called the Slumber Wreckers.

The opera house had several celebrities perform on the stage. In 1942, singer Jaye P. Morgan (later J.P. Morgan) whose parents were onetime residents of Mancos, gave a performance. In 1965, Diane Hall, later known as Diane Keaton, played the lead in Little Mary Sunshine on the opera house stage. Diane was one of fourteen southern California college students who came to Mancos to revive the "mellerdramer" during the summer in the opera house. This was the last performance held in the opera house.

In 1953, the first floor became the headquarters for the local post of the Veterans of Foreign Wars. The large display windows were bricked up leaving entry doors in each bay flanked by small rectangular windows. The original first floor facade of display windows with clerestories and recessed entrances, was bricked up in 1958. The VFW used the first floor as their meeting space, as well as for community uses. In the 1960s and 1970s, the VFW provided space on the first floor for the fledgling collections of the Mancos Public Library and the Historical Museum.

In 1985, plans were made by the townspeople and the VFW for the restoration of the opera house. A Theater Renovation Committee was established to seek and apply for funds and grants and preliminary plans and estimates were prepared.

In 2002, when the building was in danger of collapsing, The Colorado Historical Fund financed an expensive remodel of the building, including the installation of stabilizing beams under some of the balconies in the theater and repairs to the roof. Because the building was listed on the National Register of Historic Places and had been a recipient of Historical Fund money, the building’s exterior was not changed.

In 2017, Philip and Linda Walters began the task of renovating the opera house.

Both Philip and Linda Walters were longtime preservationists. Philip was involved with the 2002 project to rehabilitate the opera house. Linda was a member of the Mancos Valley Historical Society and had helped restore the Mancos Common Press.

In 2020, during the COVID-19 pandemic and as renovations continued, the Mancos Opera House served as the headquarters for filming a TV-pilot for "Badwater," scripted by Cortez novelist Chuck (C. Joseph) Greaves and directed by Felíx Enríquez Alcalá (“ER,” “Criminal Minds,” “The Good Wife” and “Breaking Bad.”)

In 2022, Colorado Preservation, Inc. awarded Philip and Linda Walters with the Dana Crawford and Alpine Bank State Honor Award for their preservation work.
