= Ertel Funeral Home =

- U.S. National Register of Historic Places
- Location: 42 N. Market St., Cortez, Colorado
- Coordinates: 37°20′58″N 108°35′03″W
- Area: less than one acre
- Built: 1936
- Architect: Simon, Walter H. Simon
- Architectural style: Mission/spanish Revival
- NRHP reference No.: 95001248
- Added to NRHP: November 7, 1995

The Ertel Funeral Home, at 42 N. Market St. in Cortez, Colorado, was listed on the National Register of Historic Places in 1995.

It was designed by Denver architect Walter H. Simon, and "is an interesting interpretation of the Mission style that incorporates Pueblo Revival elements." It was built in 1936.
