= Lebanon, Colorado =

Unincorporated community in Montezuma County, CO, USA

Coordinates: 37°27′26″N 108°35′29″W

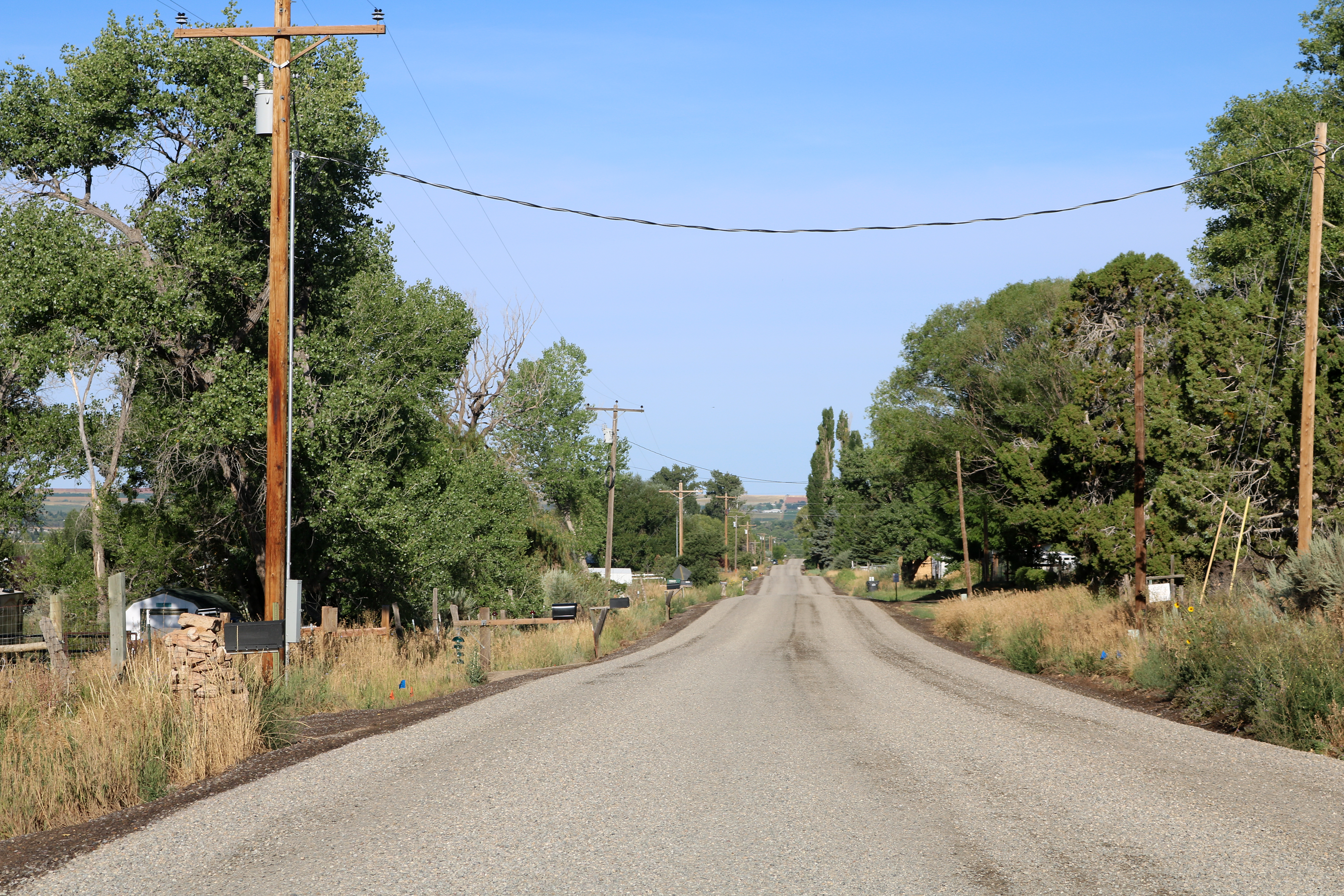
Looking west along County Road T in Lebanon

Lebanon is a small, unincorporated community in Montezuma County, Colorado, United States. It is located north of Cortez, Colorado and is served by the Dolores Post Office, Zip Code 81323.

A post office called Lebanon was established in 1908, and remained in operation until 1939. The community was named after the Cedars of Lebanon.
