= Montezuma Valley Irrigation Company Flume No. 6 =

- U.S. National Register of Historic Places
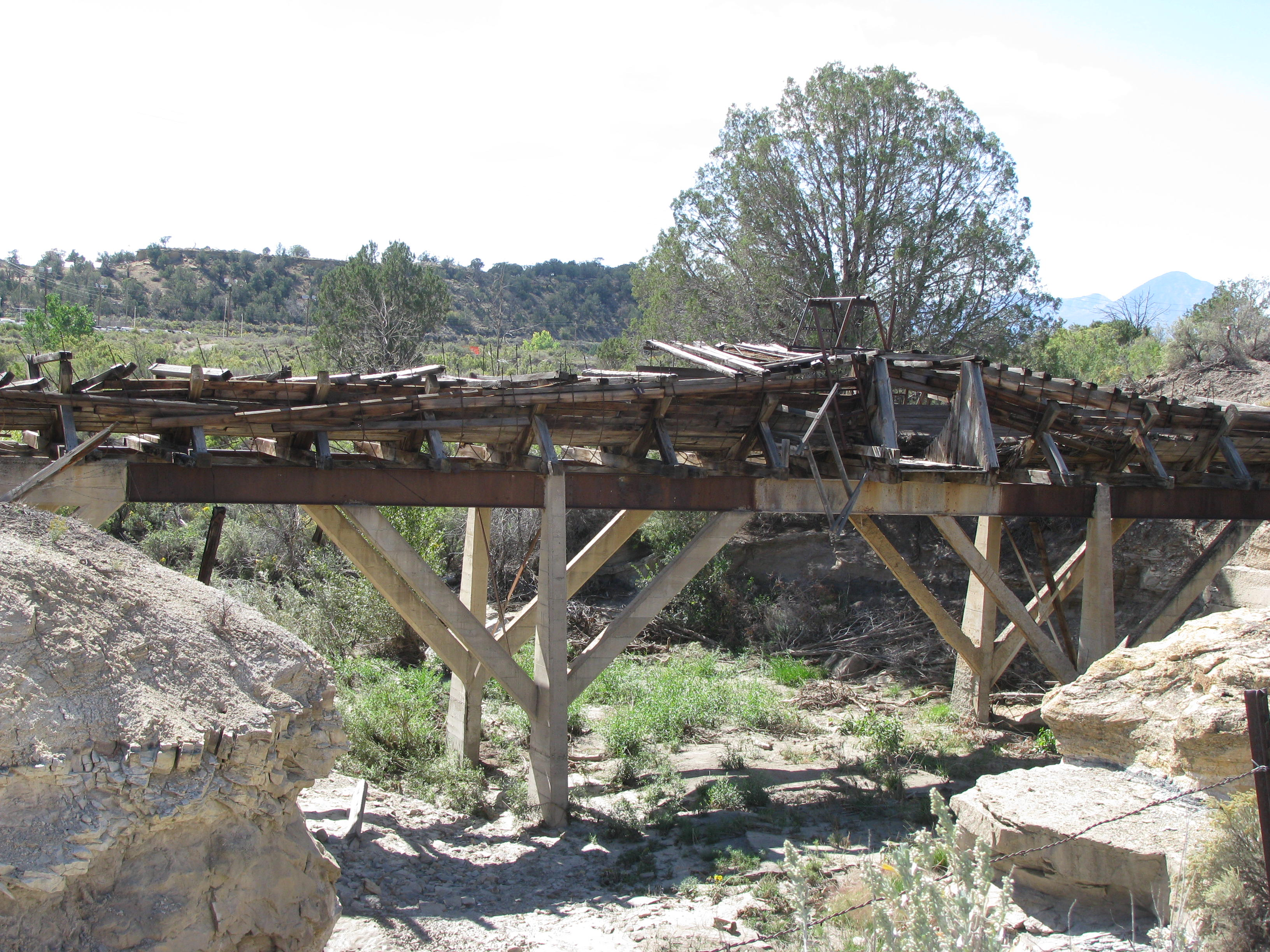
- Photo from 2012

- Location within Colorado Location within the United States
- Nearest city: Cortez, Colorado
- Coordinates: 37°20′52″N 108°30′10″W
- Area: less than one acre
- Built: 1921
- Built by: Montezuma Canal Co., Continental Pipe Manufacturing Co.
- Architectural style: Creo-Wood Frame
- NRHP reference No.: 12000146
- Added to NRHP: March 27, 2012

Montezuma Valley Irrigation Company Flume No. 6, near Cortez, Colorado, was built in 1921. It was listed on the National Register of Historic Places in 2012.

The flume is creosote treated wood-frame structure, constructed by the Montezuma Canal Co. and the Continental Pipe Manufacturing Co.

It has also been referred to as the McElmo Creek Flume.

It is located approximately 4 miles (6.4 km) east of Cortez on US 160.

As of 2019, The Montezuma Valley Irrigation Company continued to operate.
