= Anderson Presbyterian Church =

Historic church in Tennessee, United States

- U.S. National Register of Historic Places
- Location within Tennessee Location within the United States
- Location: 899 Steam Mill Ferry Rd., Madison Hall, Tennessee
- Coordinates: 35°33′42″N 88°52′22″W
- Area: 2.8 acres (1.1 ha)
- Built: 1894
- Architectural style: Gable front
- NRHP reference No.: 07000157
- Added to NRHP: March 15, 2007

Anderson Presbyterian Church is a historic church at 899 Steam Mill Ferry Road in the Madison Hall community of rural Madison County, Tennessee.

The gable-front church was built in 1894 for the benefit of Presbyterians in the local area who often were unable to cross the river to get to Jackson to attend church. The building had no alterations until the 1950s, when an addition was built and new light fixtures and other modern features were installed.

The church was listed in the National Register of Historic Places in 2007 for its local architectural importance.
