= Southern Hotel (Dolores, Colorado) =

- U.S. National Register of Historic Places

- Location within Colorado Location within the United States
- Location: 101 S. Fifth St., Dolores, Colorado
- Coordinates: 37.474°N 108.50302°W
- Area: less than one acre
- Built: 1893
- Built by: E. J. Wilbur
- Architect: E. J. Wilbur
- Architectural style: Queen Anne
- NRHP reference No.: 89000018
- Added to NRHP: February 23, 1989

The Southern Hotel, at 101 South Fifth Street in Dolores, Colorado, was built in 1893. It was listed on the National Register of Historic Places in 1989. It has also been known as Benny's Hogan and as the Rio Grande Southern Hotel.
