= Montezuma Valley National Bank and Store Building =

- U.S. National Register of Historic Places

- Location within Colorado
- Location: 2-8 Main St., Cortez, Colorado
- Coordinates: 37°20′55″N 108°35′06″W
- Area: less than one acre
- Built: 1909
- Built by: Baxtrom, Peter; et al.
- Architectural style: Classical Revival
- NRHP reference No.: 08001317
- Added to NRHP: January 15, 2009

The Montezuma Valley National Bank and Store Building, at 2-8 Main St. in Cortez, Colorado, was built in 1909. It was listed on the National Register of Historic Places in 2009.

It was built by the Durango firm Stroehle & Lemmon, with stonework by local stonemason Peter Baxtrom and his son A.H. (Harry) Baxtrom.

Part or all of it has been known also as the Citizens State Bank, the Basin Industrial Bank, the Kermode Bakery and as Moffit Drug.

The listing included two contributing buildings.

For over four decades, from 1915 to 1957, this building housed the town's only bank.
