= Dolores, Colorado =

Town in Colorado, US

- Statutory town
- Town of Dolores
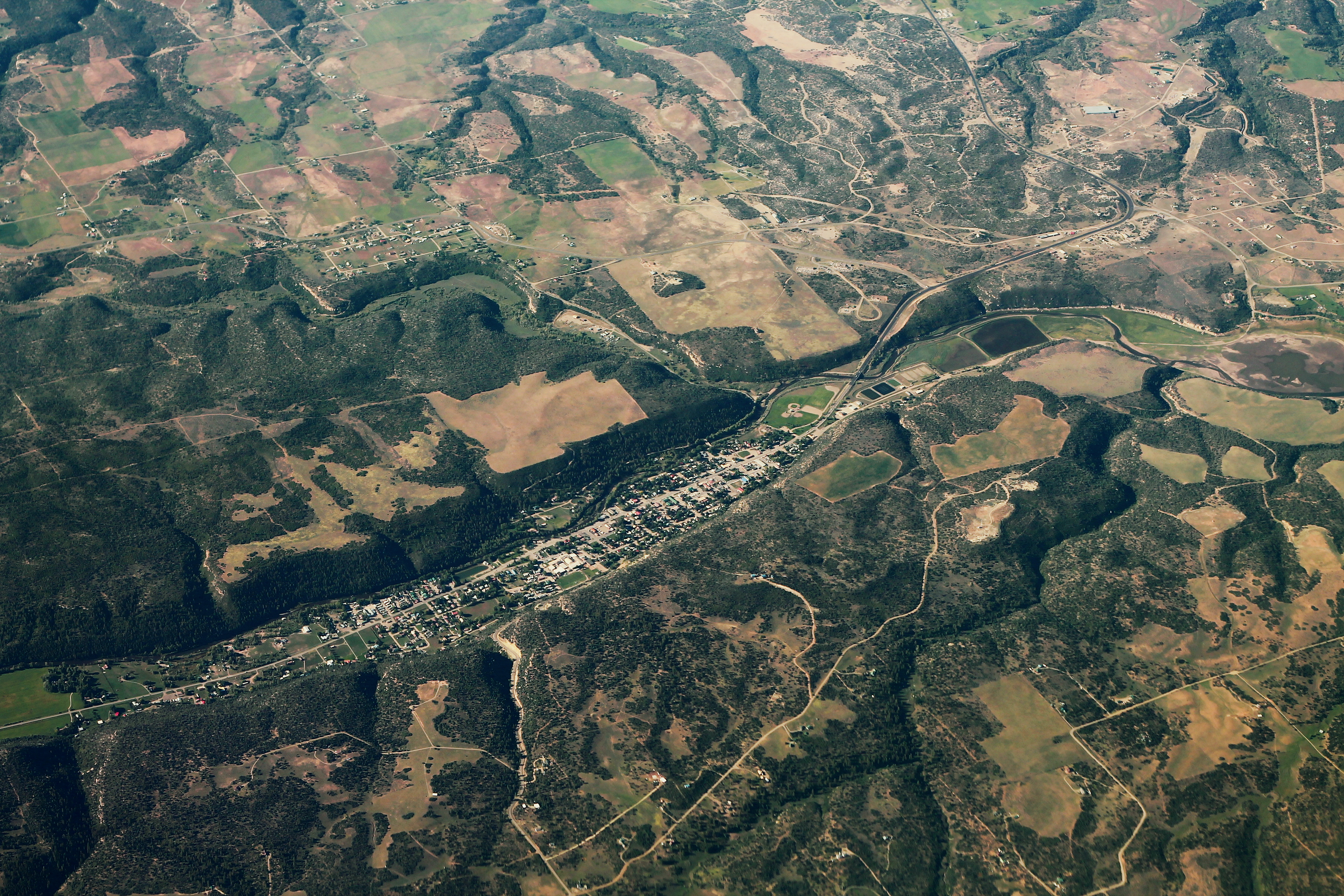
- Aerial photo of Dolores

- Location of the Town of Dolores in Montezuma County, Colorado
- Coordinates: 37°28′24″N 108°30′12″W
- Country: United States
- State: Colorado
- County: Montezuma
- Incorporated: July 19, 1900

Government
  - Type: Statutory town
  - Mayor: Chris Holkestad (2024-)

Area
  - Total: 0.664 sq mi (1.721 km^{2})
  - Land: 0.664 sq mi (1.721 km^{2})
  - Water: 0 sq mi (0.000 km^{2})
- Elevation: 6,936 ft (2,114 m)

Population (2020)
  - Total: 885
  - Density: 1,332/sq mi (514/km^{2})
- Time zone: UTC−07:00 (MST)
  - Summer (DST): UTC−06:00 (MDT)
- ZIP code: 81323
- Area codes: 970/748
- GNIS town ID: 2412439
- FIPS code: 08-20770
- Website: townofdolores.colorado.gov

Dolores is a statutory town located in Montezuma County, Colorado, United States. The town population was 885 at the 2020 United States census.

== History ==
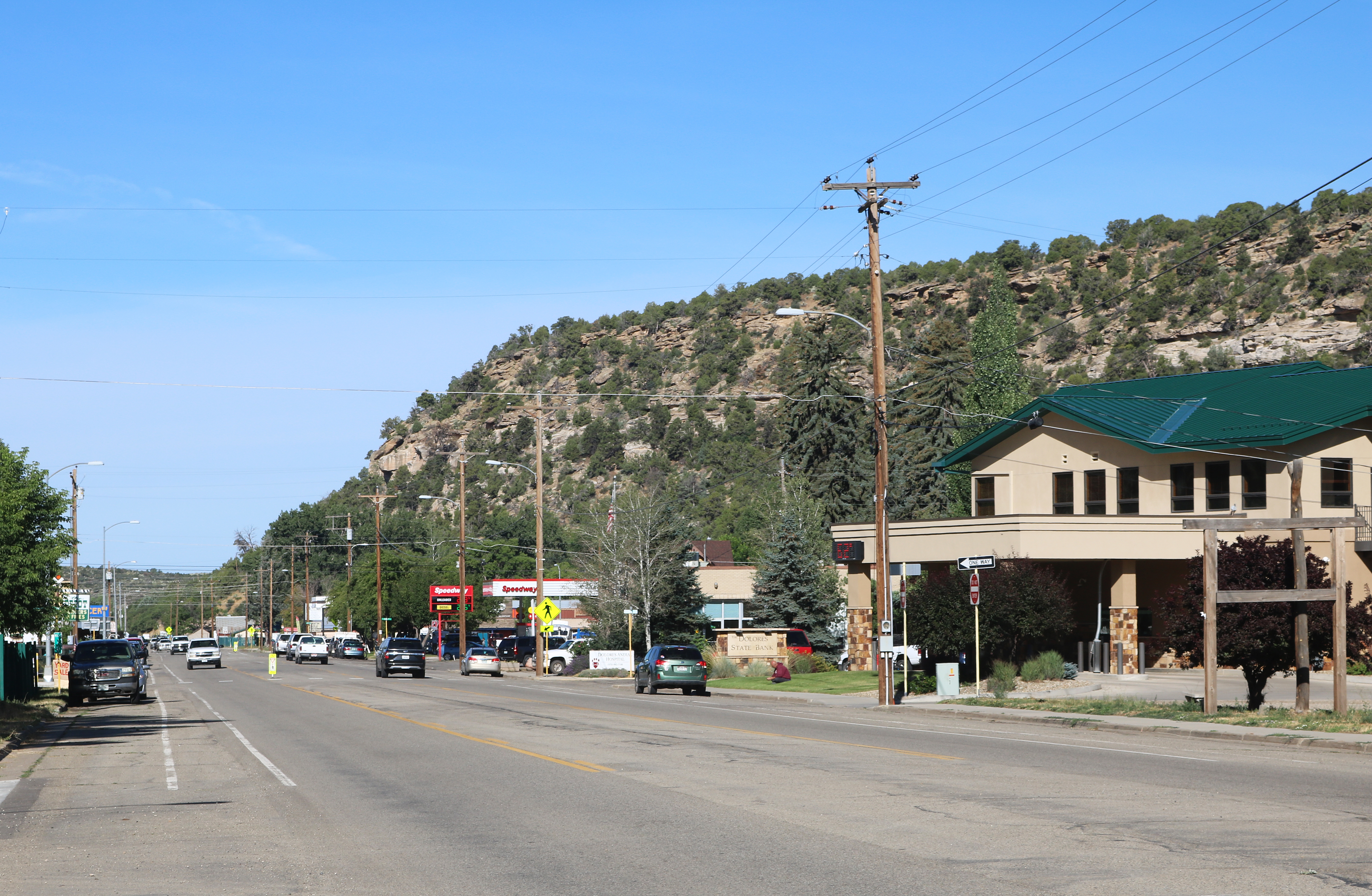
Railroad Avenue, Dolores' main street.

The Dolores, Colorado, post office opened on April 5, 1878, and the Town of Dolores was incorporated on July 19, 1900. Dolores (Spanish for "sorrows" and named for the river on which it is located) is located at the mouth of the Dolores Valley and the upper reaches of McPhee Reservoir, approximately 40 miles (64 km) from the Four Corners Monument. Established as a station on the Rio Grande Southern Railroad, it replaced the earlier town, Big Bend, now covered by McPhee Reservoir. McPhee Reservoir is named for a company town founded by New Mexico Lumber Company, that is now covered by the reservoir.

=== Historic sites ===
The following are Dolores area historic sites of the Ancient Pueblo People:

- The Canyons of the Ancients Visitor Center and Museum, and the on-site Domniguez and Escalante Pueblos are listed on the Colorado State Register of Historic Properties and the National Register of Historic Places listings in Montezuma County, Colorado.
- Canyons of the Ancients National Monument
- O'Brien Site, an Ancient Pueblo settlement of 11 pueblos occupied between AD 1075 - 1150.

Other historic sites added to the Colorado State Register of Historic Properties and National Register of Historic Places include:

- Lebanon School, also known as the Lebanon Schoolhouse
- Southern Hotel, also known as Benny's Hogan and the Rio Grande Southern Hotel

== Geography ==
At the 2020 United States census, the town had a total area of 425 acres (1.721 km^{2}), all of it land.

The town is confined to a narrow valley bottom along the Dolores River near the point where the river turns from flowing southward out of the San Juan Mountains to the north. Built-up areas outside the town limits include extensive residential, commercial, and minor-industrial areas upstream in the valley floor, on Summit Ridge to the south-southwest, and on high ground to the west, at the intersections of Colorado Highways 145 and 184.

== Demographics ==
Historical population
Census	Pop.	Note	%±
1900	108		—
1910	320		196.3%
1920	465		45.3%
1930	557		19.8%
1940	804		44.3%
1950	729		−9.3%
1960	805		10.4%
1970	820		1.9%
1980	802		−2.2%
1990	866		8.0%
2000	857		−1.0%
2010	936		9.2%
2020	885		−5.4%
U.S. Decennial Census

As of the census of 2010, there were 936 people, 431 households, and 236 families residing in the town. The population density was 1,337.1 inhabitants per square mile (516.3/km^{2}). There were 501 housing units at an average density of 715.7 per square mile (276.3/km^{2}). The racial makeup of the town was 90.38% White, 2.14% Native American, 0.11% Asian, 0.21% Pacific Islander, 3.42% from other races, and 3.74% from two or more races. Hispanic or Latino of any race were 10.90% of the population.

There were 431 households, out of which 25.3% had children under the age of 18 living with them, 38.5% were married couples living together, 12.1% had a female householder with no husband present, and 45.2% were non-families. 39.7% of all households were made up of individuals, and 13.9% had someone living alone who was 65 years of age or older. The average household size was 2.15 and the average family size was 2.92.

In the town, the population was spread out, with 22.5% under the age of 18, 7.5% from 18 to 24, 26.0% from 25 to 44, 28.6% from 45 to 64, and 16.3% who were 65 years of age or older. The median age was 44.7 years. For every 100 females, there were 99.6 males. For every 100 females age 18 and over, there were 99.7 males.

The median income for a household in the town was $30,417, and the median income for a family was $32,188. Males had a median income of $27,404 versus $19,286 for females. The per capita income for the town was $14,912. About 16.6% of families and 17.3% of the population were below the poverty line, including 24.1% of those under age 18 and 11.6% of those age 65 or over.

== Transportation ==
Dolores is part of Colorado's Bustang network. It is on the Durango-Grand Junction Outrider line.

== Education ==
It is in the Dolores School District RE-4A.

== See also ==
- List of municipalities in Colorado
