= Ulta Palta (1997 film) =

- Directed by: N. S. Shankar
- Written by: N. S. Shankar
- Based on: The Comedy of Errors by Shakespeare
- Produced by: N. S. Shankar; V. Manohar; Ashok Kashyap; Guna; Myna; Subrahmanya Thememane; Vijayaprasad
- Starring: Ramesh Aravind; Sanketh Kashi; Sushma Veer; Pooja Lokesh; Karibasavaiah
- Cinematography: Ashok Kashyap
- Edited by: Guna
- Music by: V. Manohar
- Release date: 27 June 1997
- Running time: 138 minutes
- Country: India
- Language: Kannada

Ulta Palta (transl. Topsy-turvy) is a 1997 Indian Kannada film directed by N. S. Shankar and starring Ramesh Aravind, Sanketh Kashi and Sushma Veer. The film is a remake of the 1963 Bengali film Bhranti Bilas, which itself is based on Shakespeare's The Comedy of Errors. The music of the film was composed by V. Manohar. The film was remade in Telugu language with the same name (1998) and in Tamil as Ambuttu Imbuttu Embuttu (2005) starring Ashok Kashyap who was one of the co-producers and cinematographer of the film.

== Plot ==
Two sets of identical twins are lost in their childhood. None of them are aware of their twin being alive. One set of twins arrive to a town on work, which is where the other set of twins live and make their living. The people of the town confuse the newcomer for the latter, who is a famous industrialist in the town. A series of misunderstandings, misplacements and confusions about the characters turn into hilarious situations and chaos in their lives.

== Cast ==
- Ramesh Aravind as Devaraj and Devaraj and also both of their respective fathers
- Sushma Veer as Sheela, the first Devaraj's wife
- Pooja Lokesh as Meera, Sheela's younger sister
- Pavitra Lokesh as Mohini, the first Devaraj's love interest
- Sanketh Kashi as Rama and Rama
- Karibasavaiah as Shivanandappa's lackey
- Myna Chandru as Kumara, Mohini's admirer
- Sunetra Pandit as Chenni, the first Rama's wife and the first Devaraj's housemaid
- Girija Lokesh as the nun
- H. G. Dattatreya as the police inspector
- Ramesh Pandit as first Devaraj's school friend
- Hulivana Gangadharaiah as Shivanandappa
- Shankar Rao as Shettru, the jewellery shop owner
- Ummatthal Sathya
- Subramanya Thememane
- Srishailan
- Venkatachalam

== Production ==
The film was launched on 10 March 1997 on the birthday of film's director Shankar. It was one of those Kannada films which was funded by technicians. Nine technicians who worked on the film funding it however in the end, only seven of them were left as producers including V Manohar, Ashok Cashyap, editor Guna, associate Vijaya Prasad, Subrahmanya Thememane and actor Myna. The entire film was shot in Koppa, a town in Chikmagalur district of Karnataka.

== Soundtrack ==
The music of the film was composed and lyrics written by V. Manohar except one poetry written by K. S. Narasimhaswamy.

No.	Title	Lyrics	Singer(s)	Length
1.	"Chigali Ho Chigali"	V. Manohar	Master Sagar, Shankar Shanbhag
2.	"Jhal Gazal Sumne Ninna"	V. Manohar	B. Jayashree
3.	"Nee Baruva Daariyali"	K. S. Narasimhaswamy	S. P. Balasubrahmanyam, K. S. Chithra
4.	"Hucchara Santhe"	V. Manohar	Rajesh Krishnan, V. Manohar
5.	"Suggi Siri Suggi Siri"	V. Manohar	Manjula Gururaj
6.	"Nee Baruva Daariyali"	K. S. Narasimhaswamy	K. S. Chithra, Rajesh Krishnan

== Awards ==
- 1997-98 : Karnataka State Film Awards
1. Best Dialogue - N. S. Shankar
2. Best Acting (Special Jury Award) - Kashi

== See also ==
- The Comedy of Errors § Adaptations
