= Molcajete =

Stone bowl used with a tejolote to grind foods

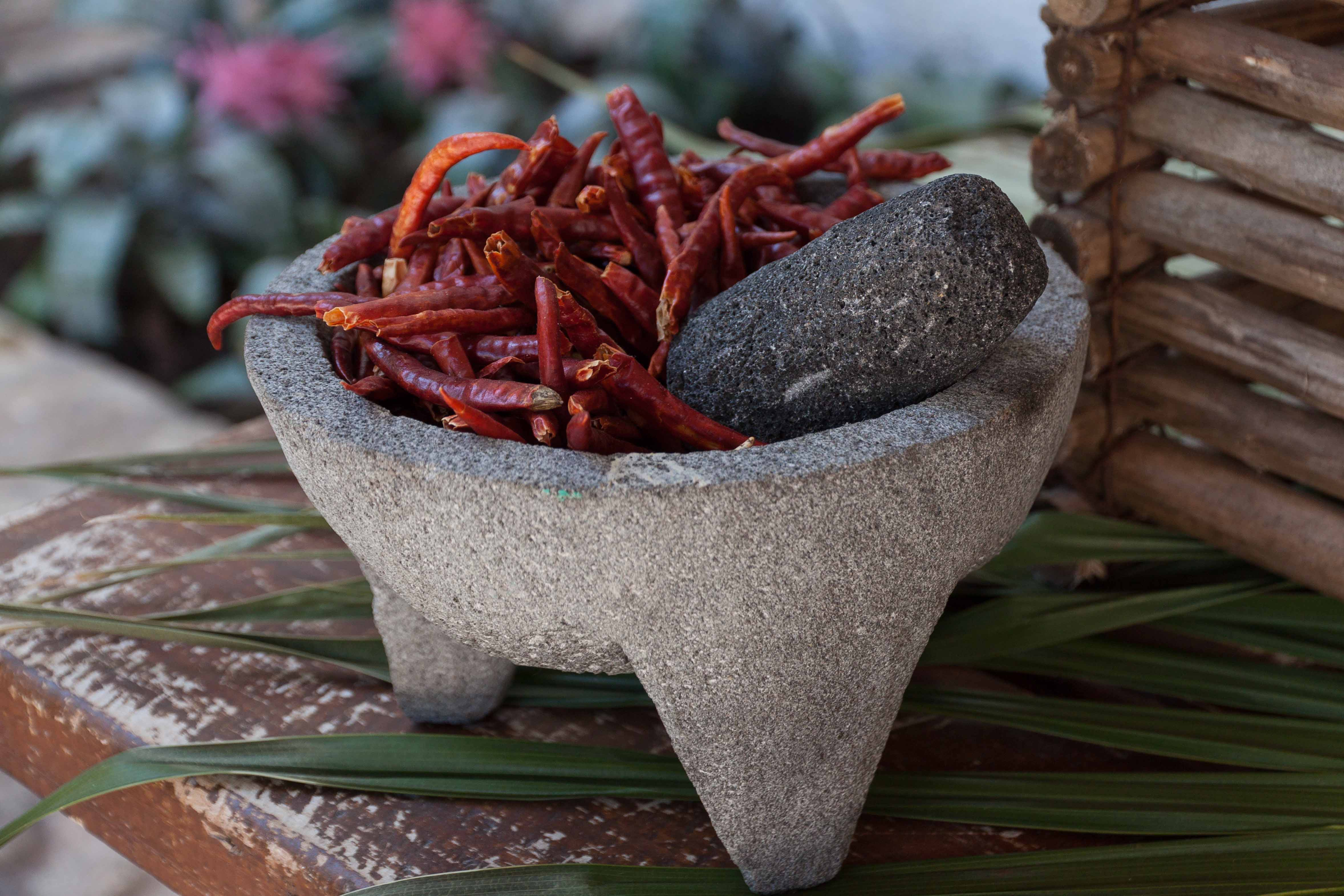
Molcajete and tejolote with peppers to be ground

A molcajete (Spanish: [molkaˈxete]; Mexican Spanish, from Nahuatl molcaxitl) and tejolote (from Nahuatl texolotl) are stone tools, the traditional Central American and especially, the Mexican version of the mortar and pestle used for grinding various food products.

Huge molcajetes have been found from use in the pre-Hispanic Mesoamerican period. They had lids and the set is believed to have been used for burials of members of high status in society.

In function and the material from which it is made, the molcajete is similar to the South American batan, but they are not similar in shape.

Although true molcajetes are made of basalt, imitations are sometimes made of a mixture of pressed concrete and volcanic rock particles.

== Description ==
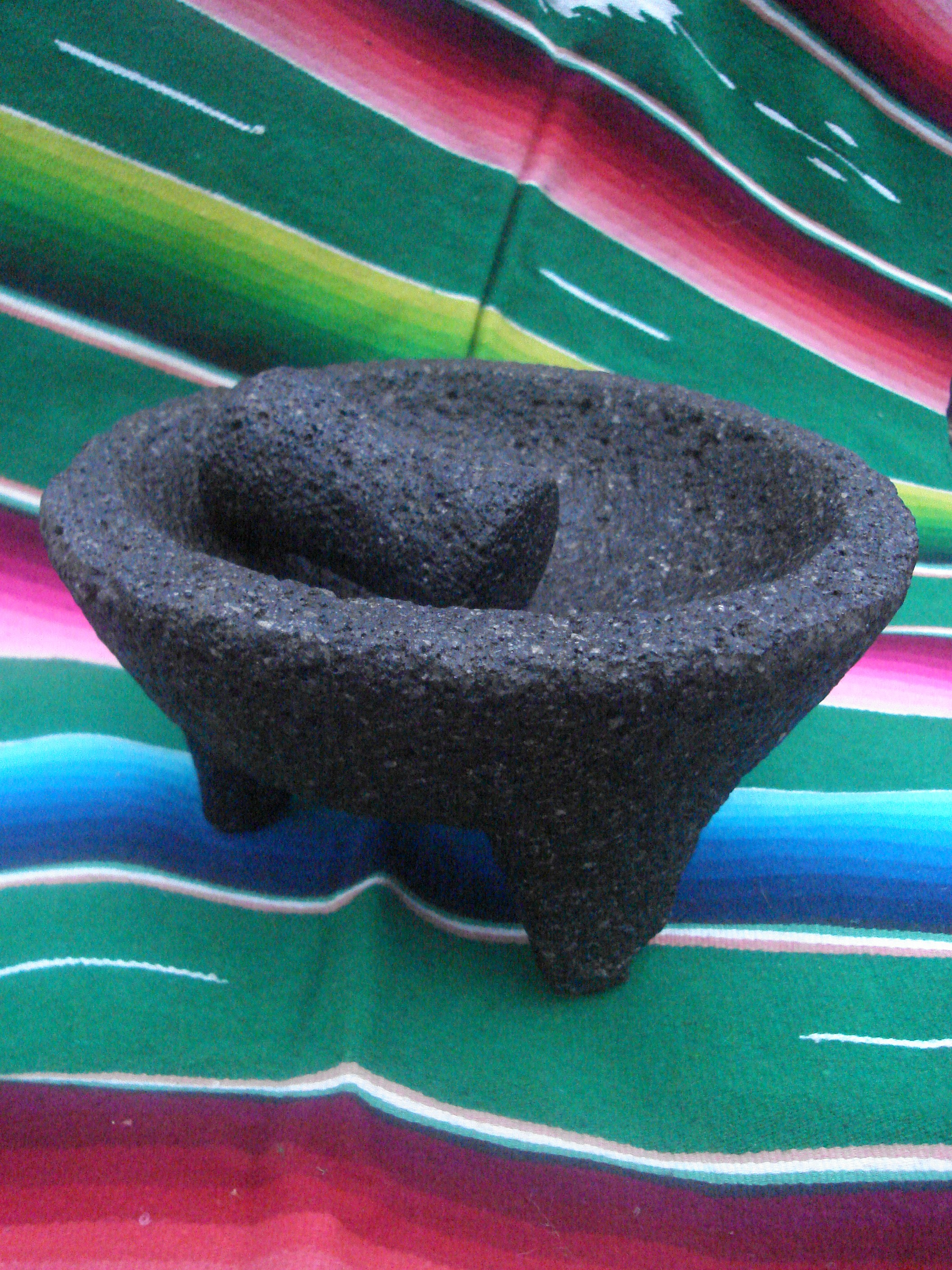
A molcajete holds its matching tejolote.

The molcajete was used by pre-Hispanic Mesoamerican cultures, including the Aztec and Maya. Traditionally carved out of a single block of vesicular basalt, molcajetes are typically round in shape and supported by three short legs. Additionally, throughout the pre-Hispanic Mesoamerican period, they were decorated with various colors and designs with orange wares identified as the most common characteristic of the molcajete. The matching hand-held grinding tool, known as a tejolote (Mexican Spanish, from Nahuatl texolotl), is made of the same basalt material.

Molcajetes frequently are decorated with the carved head of an animal on the outside edge of the bowl, giving the molcajete the appearance of a short, stout, three-legged animal. Since its introduction by Europeans, the pig is the most common animal head used for decoration of this type. They also are used for decoration. This design is a very popular item for sale in the taquerías (taco shops) of modern Mexico City.

== Use and care ==
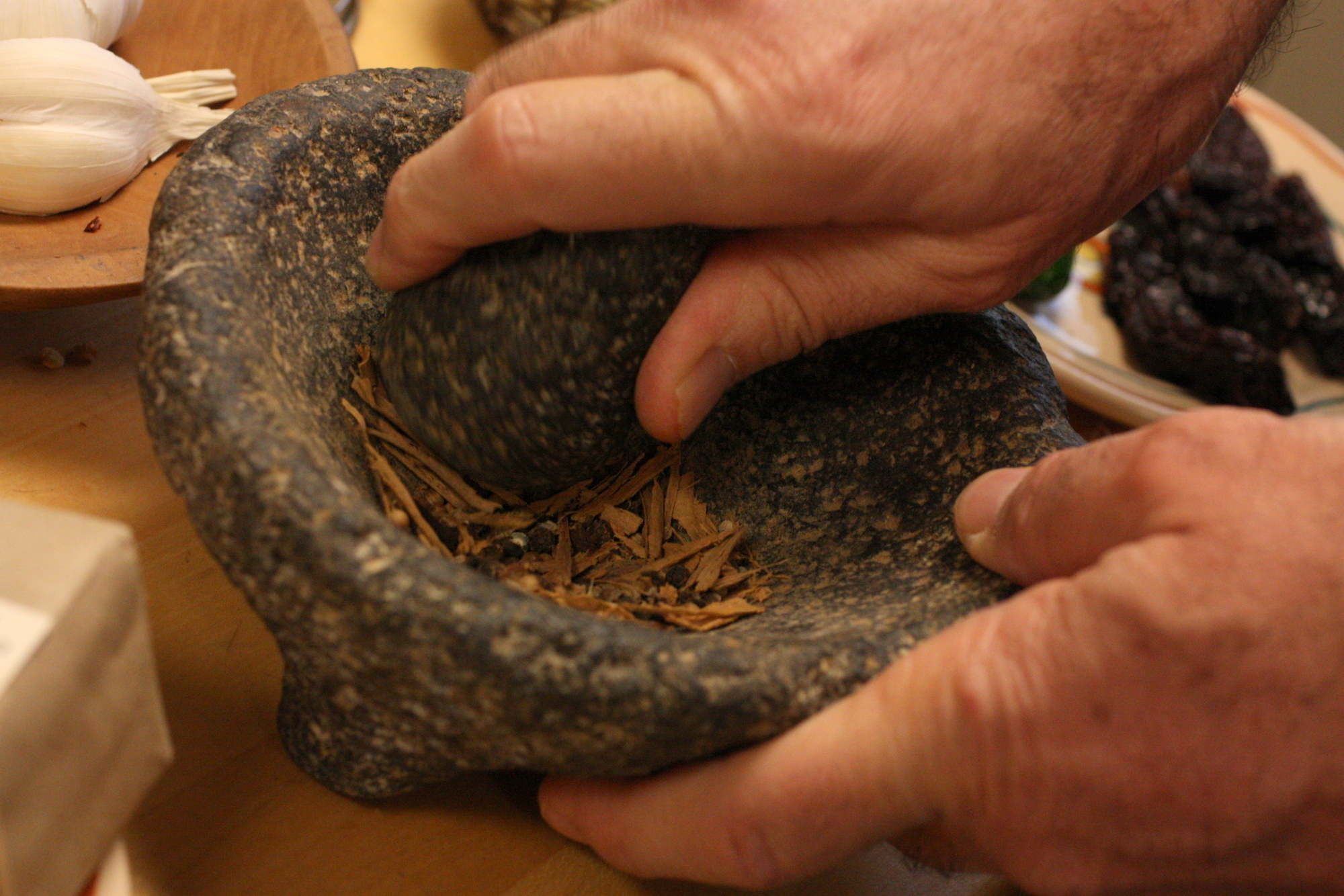
Molcajete used to grind spices

Molcajetes are used to crush and grind spices and to prepare salsas and guacamole. The rough surface of the basalt stone creates a superb grinding surface that maintains itself over time as tiny bubbles in the basalt are ground down, replenishing the textured surface.

A new basalt molcajete needs to be "broken in" because small grains of basalt may be loosened from the surface to prevent it from giving an unpleasant gritty texture to the first few items prepared in it. A simple way to do the initial adaptation is to repeatedly grind uncooked white rice in the molcajete, a handful at a time. When the resulting white rice flour finally has no visible grains of basalt in it, the molcajete is ready to use. Some rice flour may remain ground into the surface of the molcajete, but this causes no problems. As the porous basalt is impossible to fully clean and sanitize, molcajetes are known to "season" (much as cast iron skillets), transferring flavors from one preparation to another. Salsas and guacamole prepared in molcajetes are known to have a distinctive texture and to carry a subtle difference in flavor from those prepared in blenders.

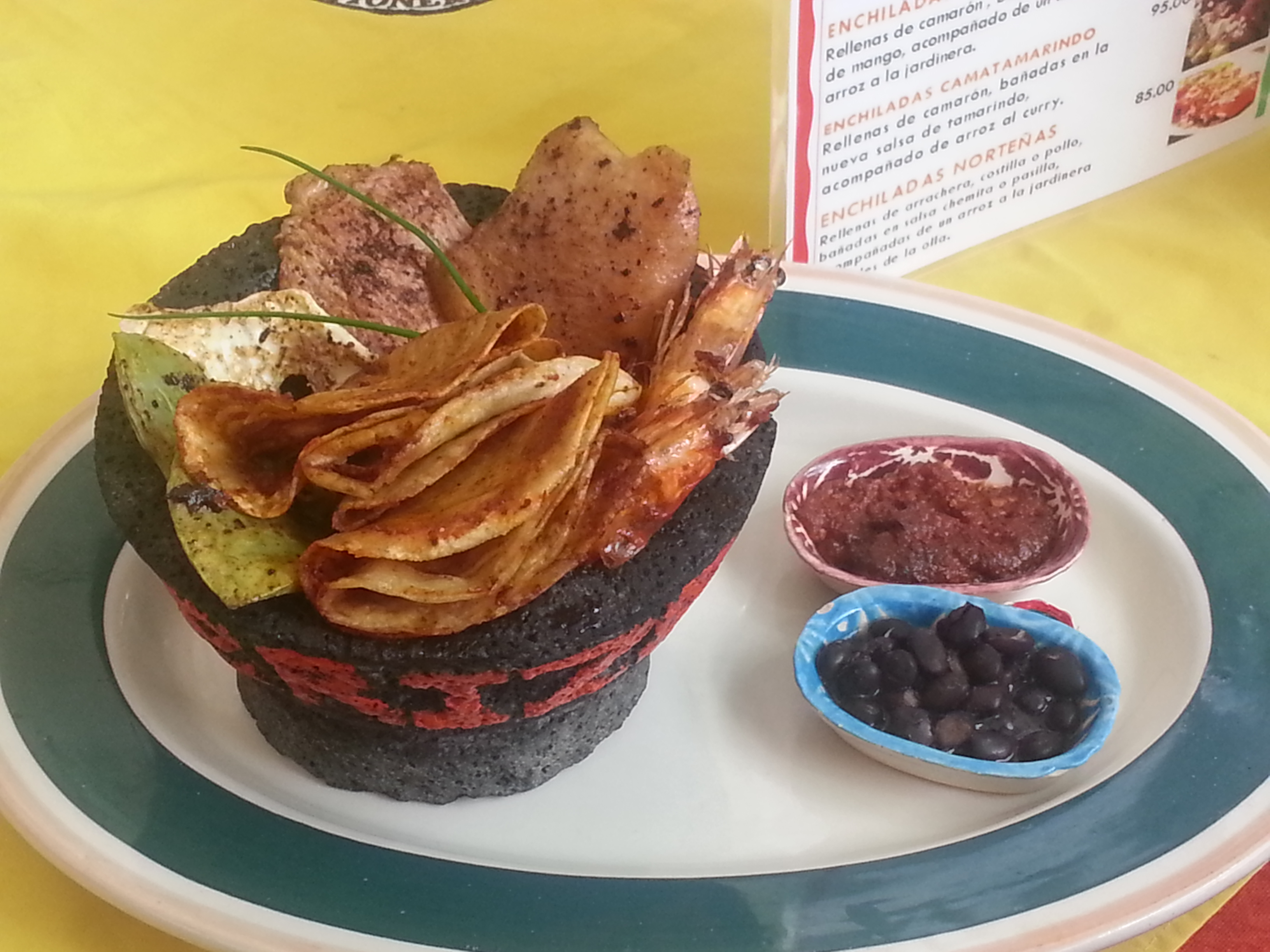
Molcajete used to serve food

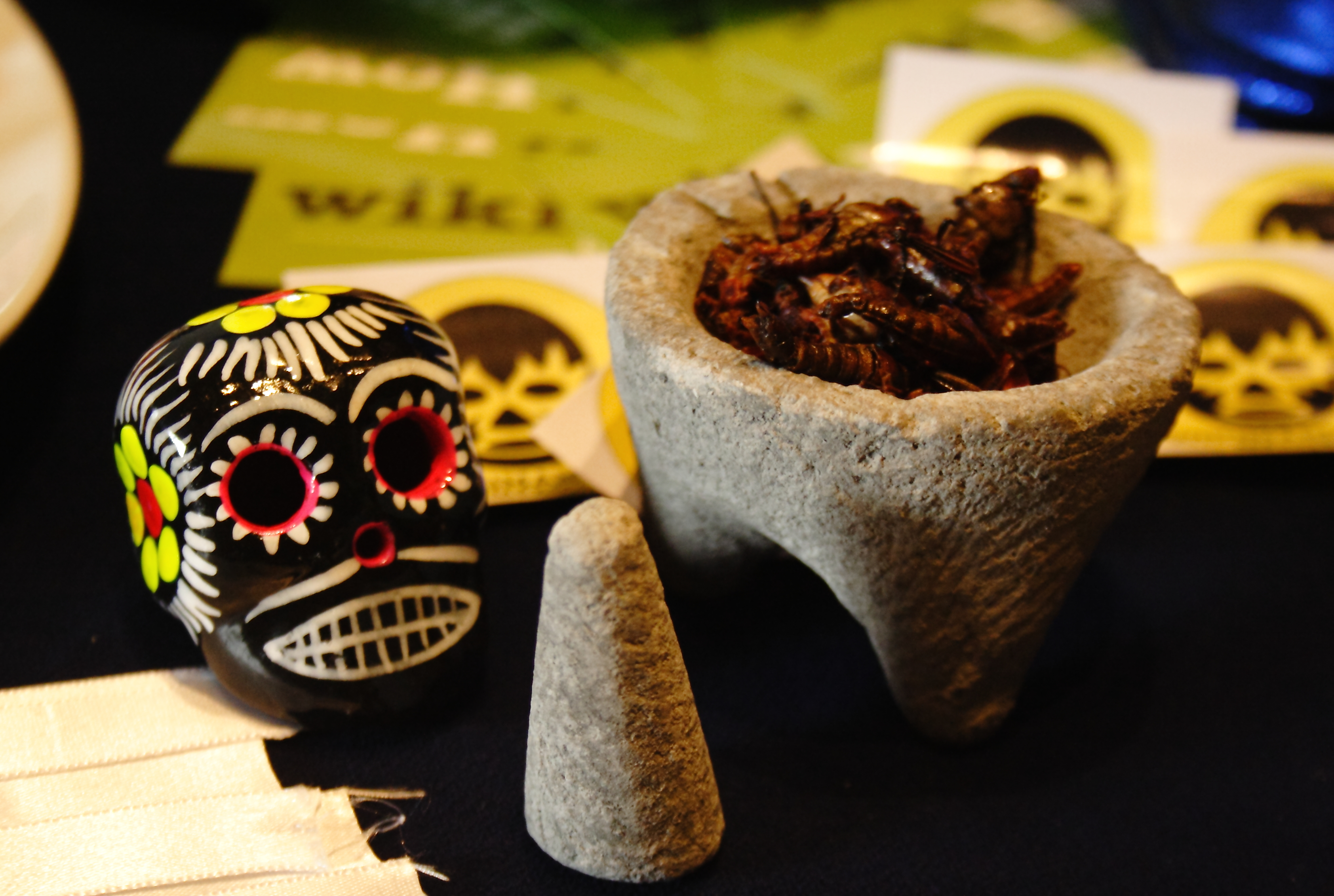
Molcajete used as decoration

Molcajetes may be used as a cooking tool, where it is heated to a high temperature using an open fire or hot coals and then used to heat food placed in it. The molcajete stays hot for a very long time due to its high thermal mass and it is not unusual for a stew to still be bubbling half an hour after serving, although recipes are not usually stewed or otherwise cooked in them.

Molcajetes are used as dish service in restaurants and homes.

== Gallery ==
Examples of molcajetes and tejolotes

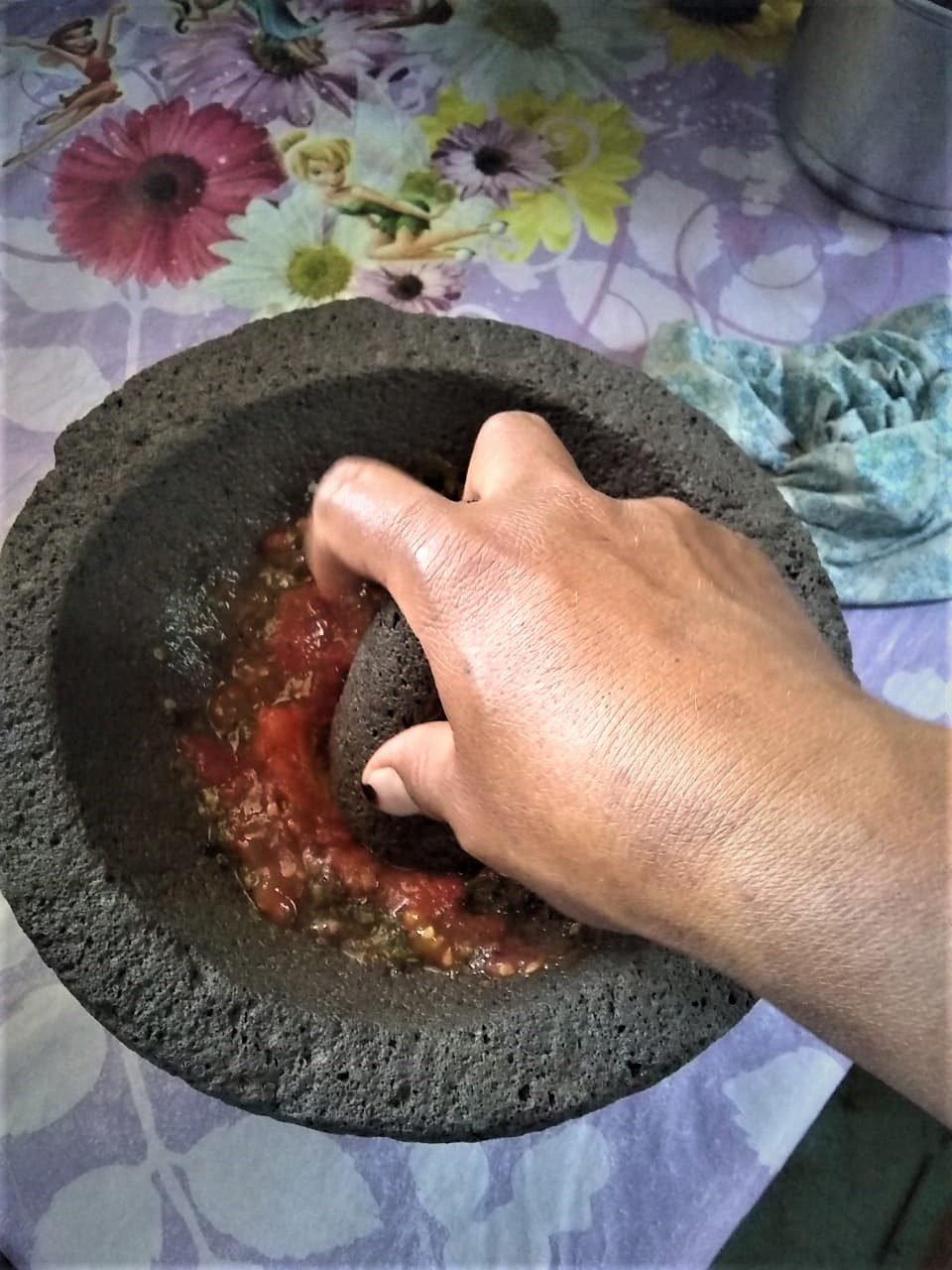
Grinding in a molcajete, San Juan Achiutla, Oaxaca, México

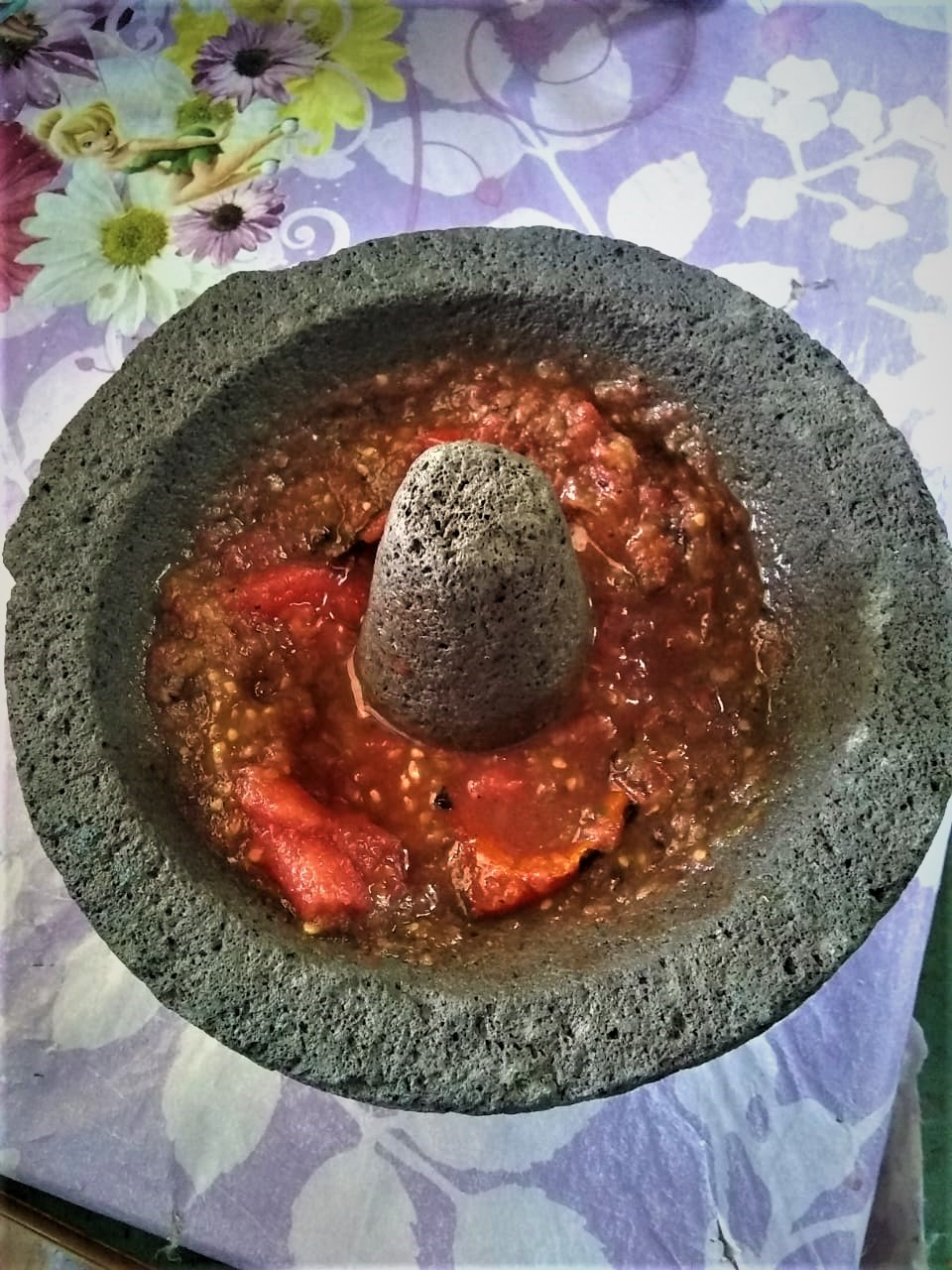
"Salsa de molcajete", San Juan Achiutla, Oaxaca, México

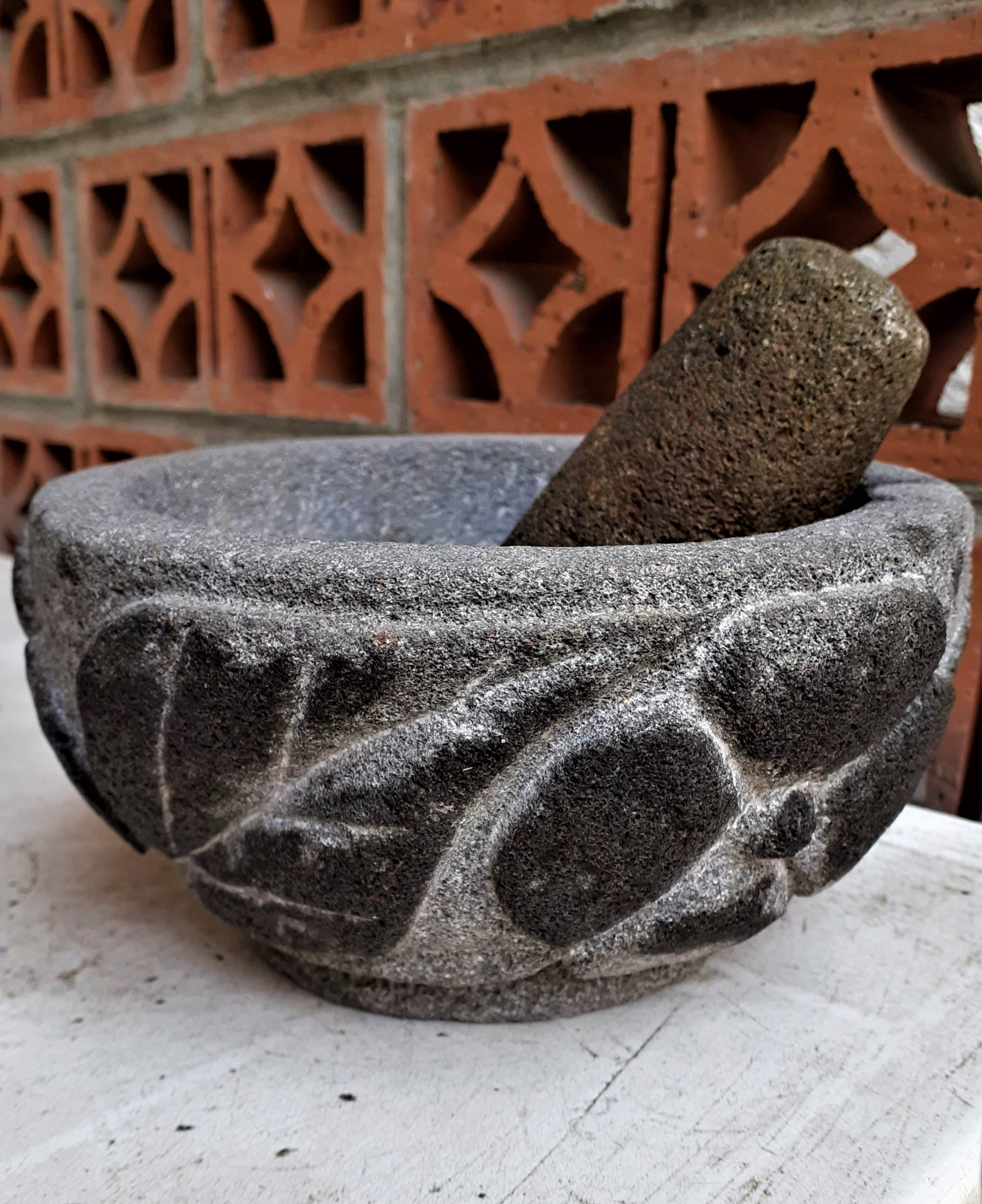
Molcáxitl with flower petal decoration, San Salvador el Seco, Puebla, México

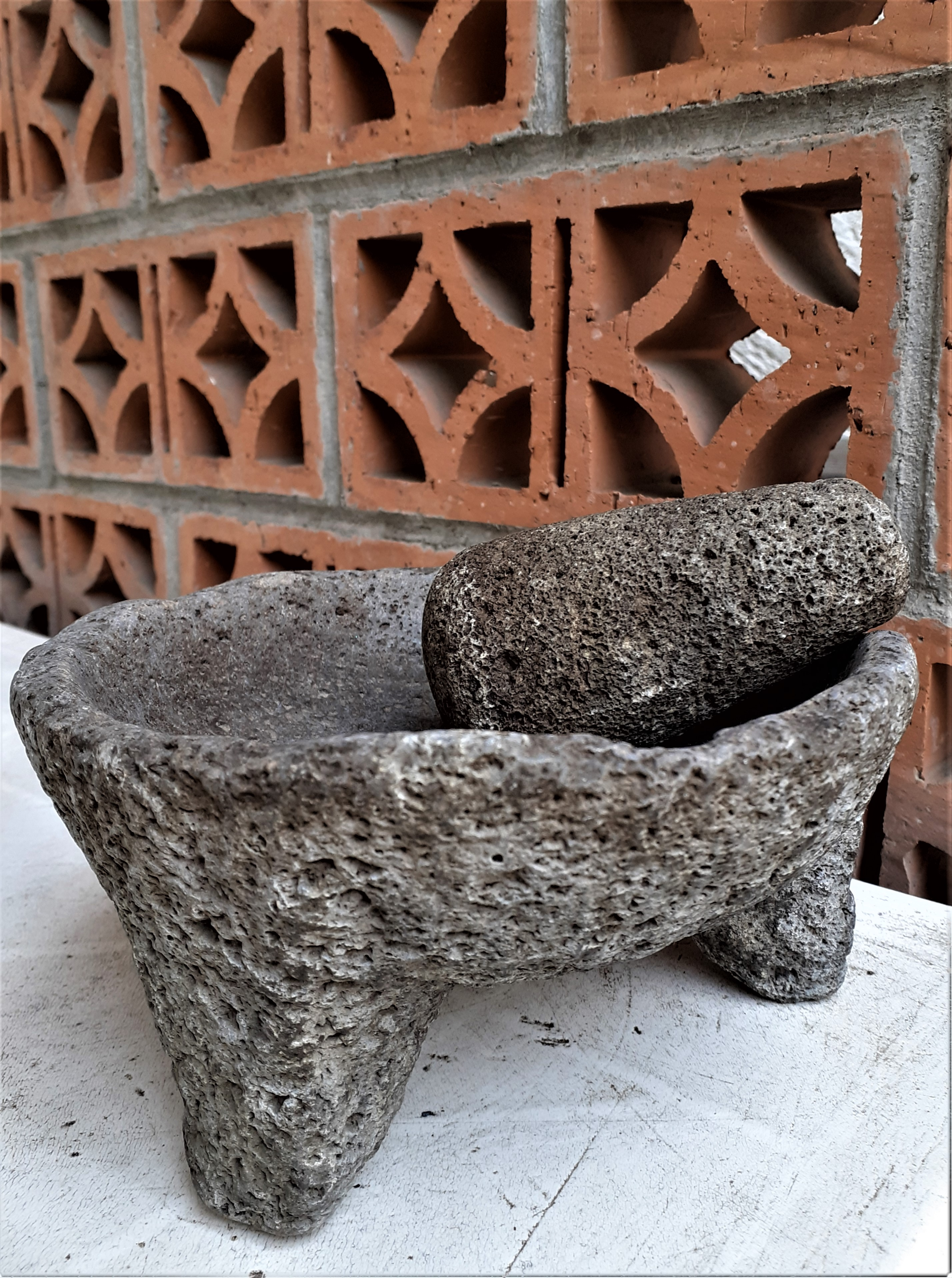
Well-used tripod molcajete, origin unknown, Puebla, Mexico

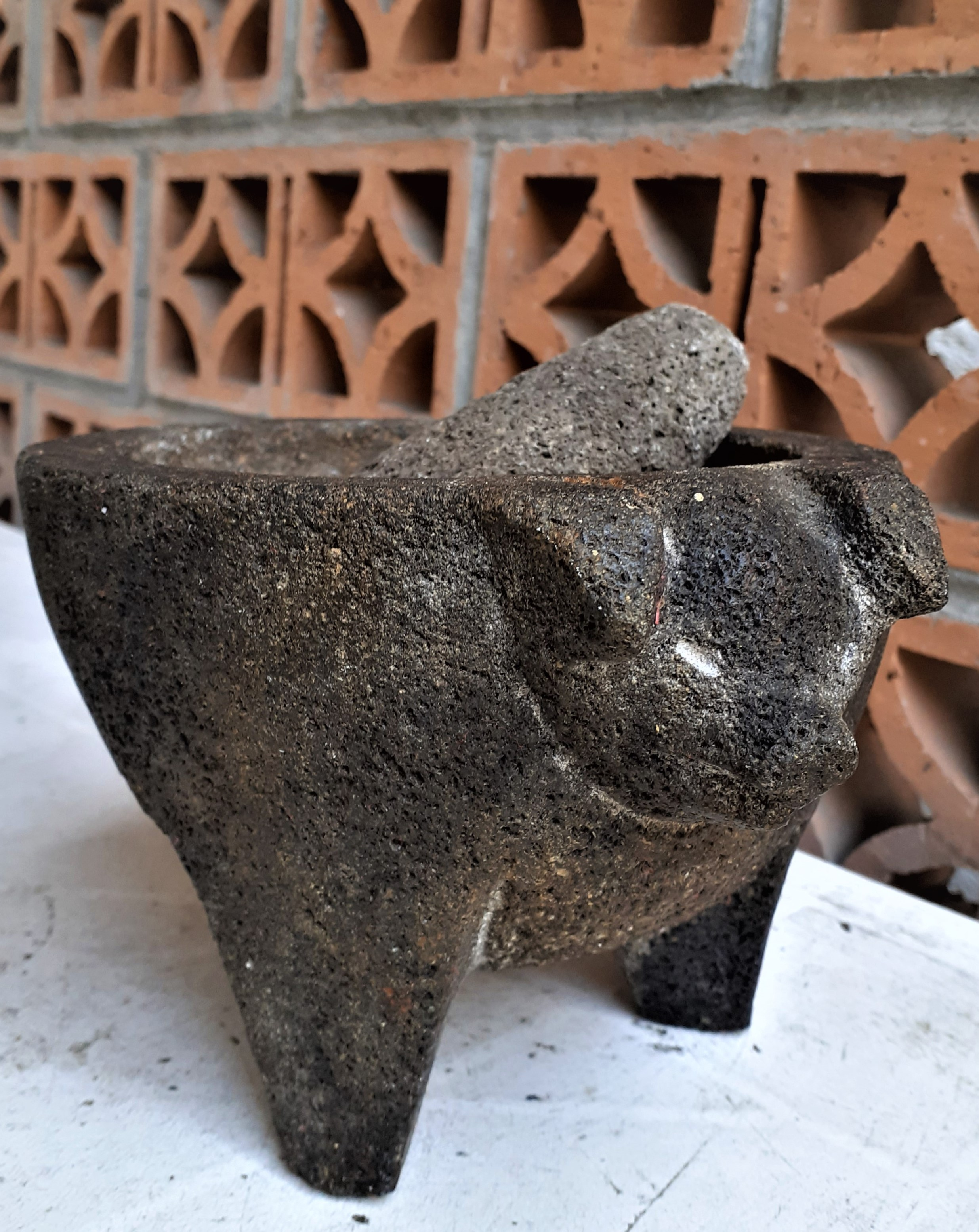
Molcajete with a pig head decoration, San Salvador el Seco, Puebla, México

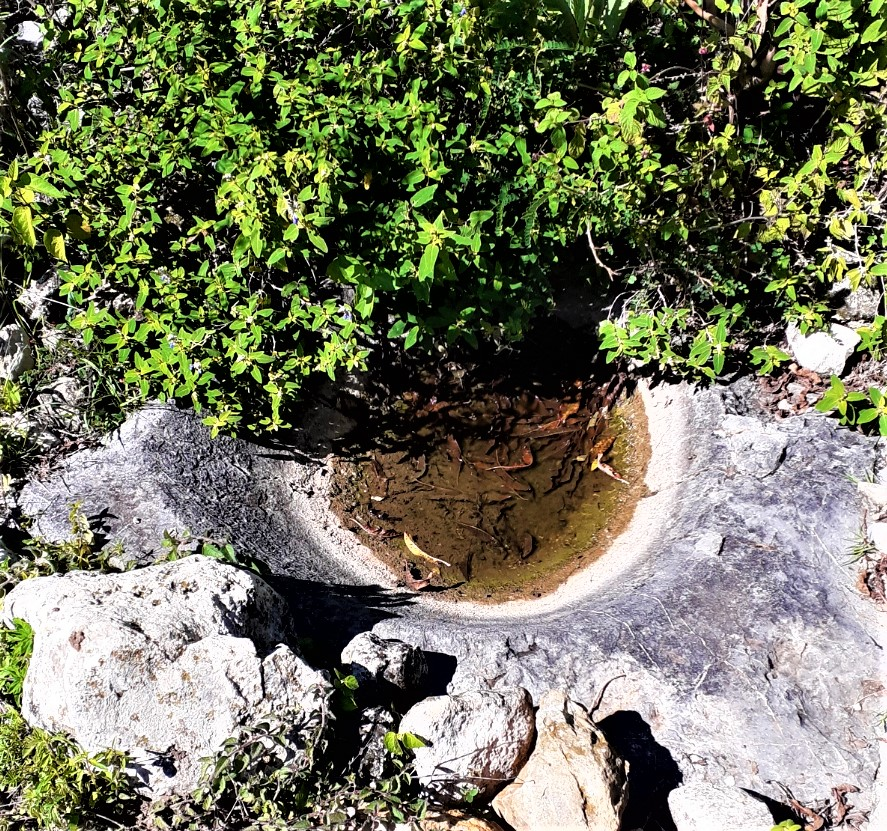
Stone in situ molcajete, probably pre-Hispanic, municipality of San Miguel Achiutla, Oaxaca, Mexico

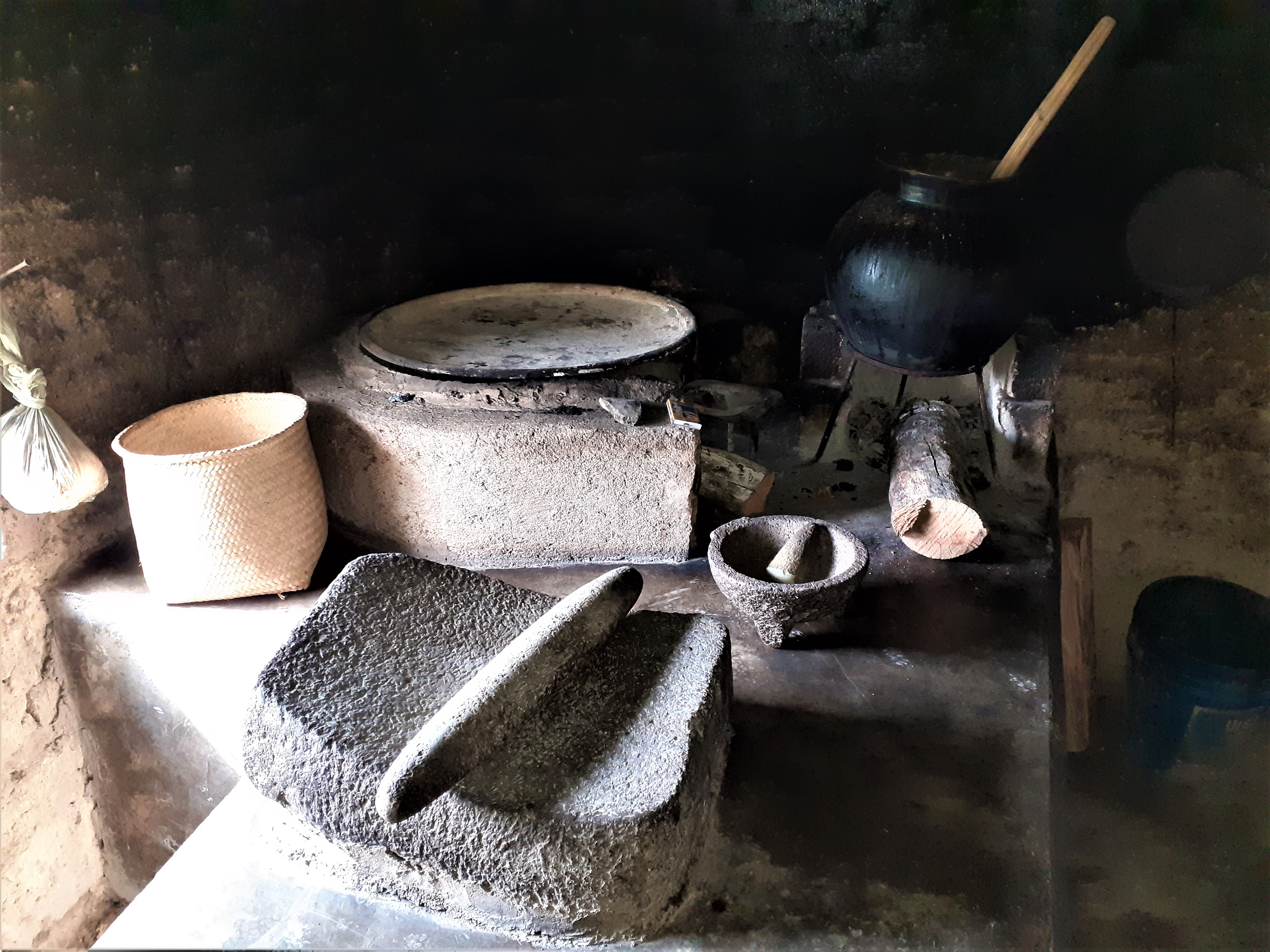
A complete set of utensils for a contemporary indigenous kitchen with the metate and molcajete (stone mortar) in the foreground, comal, palm tenate, and a clay pot, San Juan Achiutla, Oaxaca, México, 2020

== See also ==
- Batan
- Metate
- Mortar and pestle
- Oralu kallu
- Suribachi

== Bibliography ==
- Adams, Richard E. W. (2005). Prehistoric Mesoamerica (3rd ed.). Norman: University of Oklahoma Press. ISBN 0-8061-3702-9. OCLC 58975830.
- Coe, Sophie D. (1994). America's First Cuisines (4th pbk printing [2002], 1st ed.). Austin: University of Texas Press. ISBN 0-292-71159-X. OCLC 0292711557.
- Simmons, Marie (2008). Things Cooks Love: Implements, Ingredients, Recipes. Missouri: Andrews McMeel Publishing. ISBN 978-0740769764.
