= Cuisine of North Bengal =

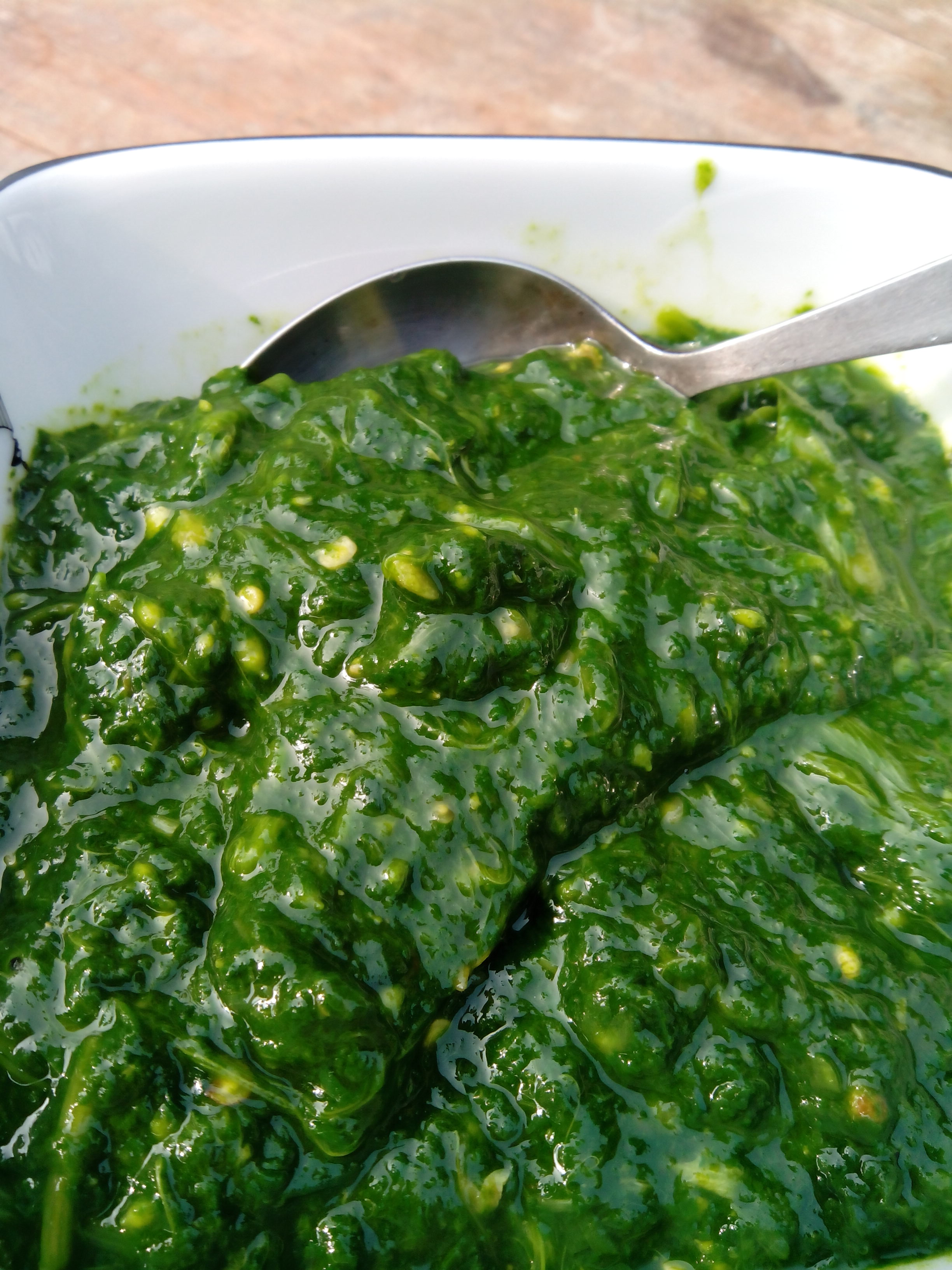
Napa cabbage pelka

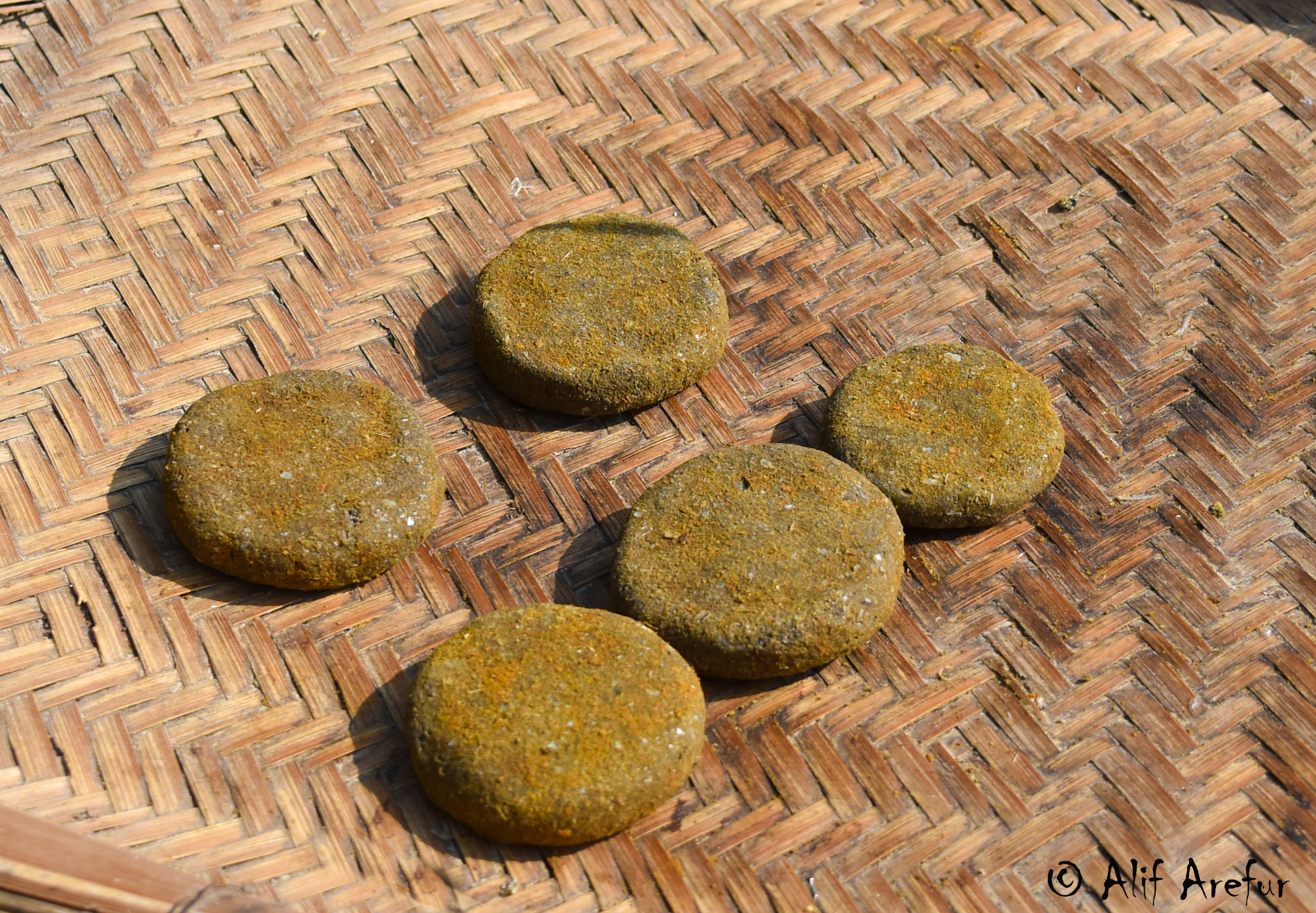
Processed sidol

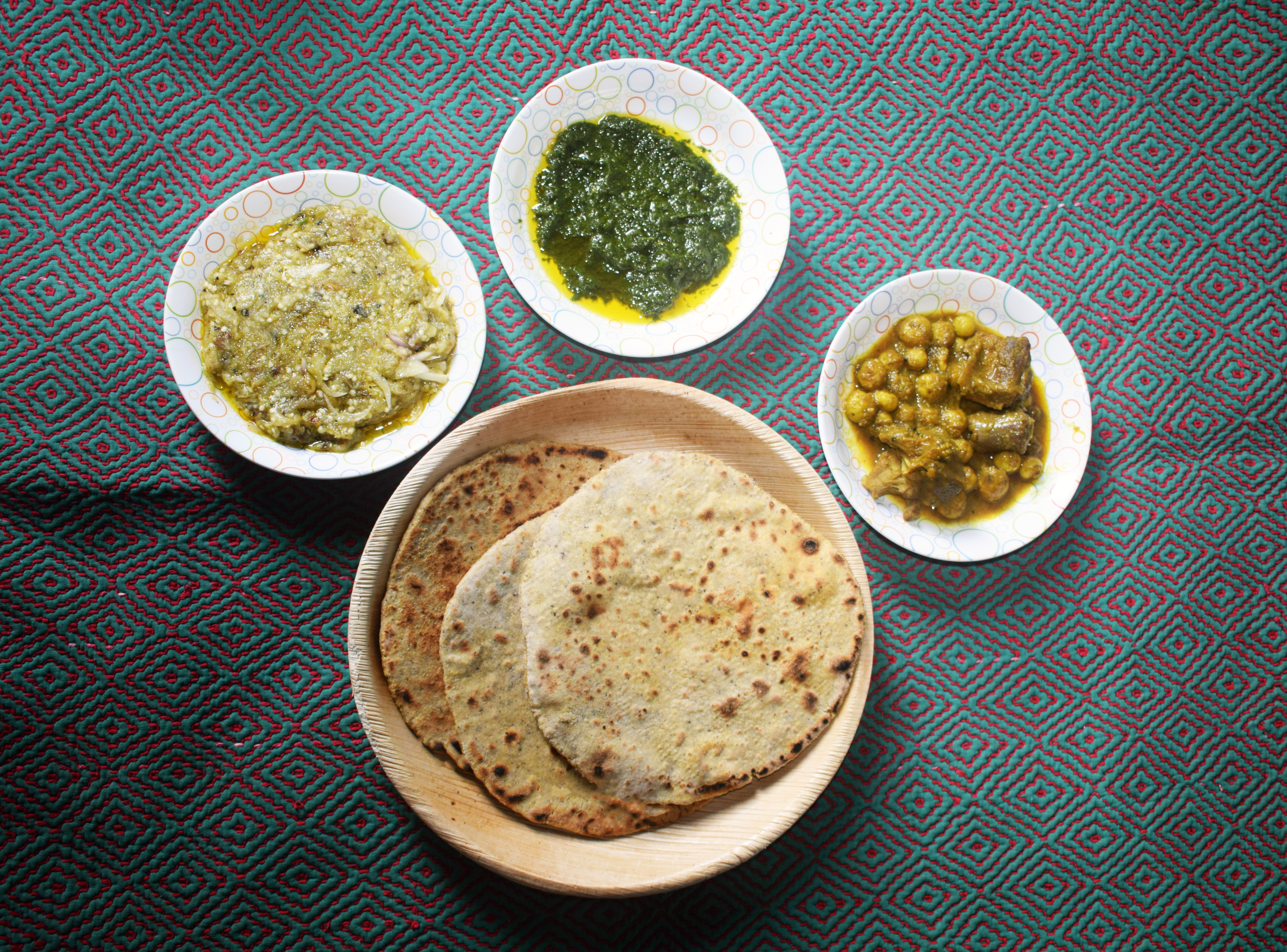
Traditional Kalai bread of Rajshahi and Chapainawabganj districts

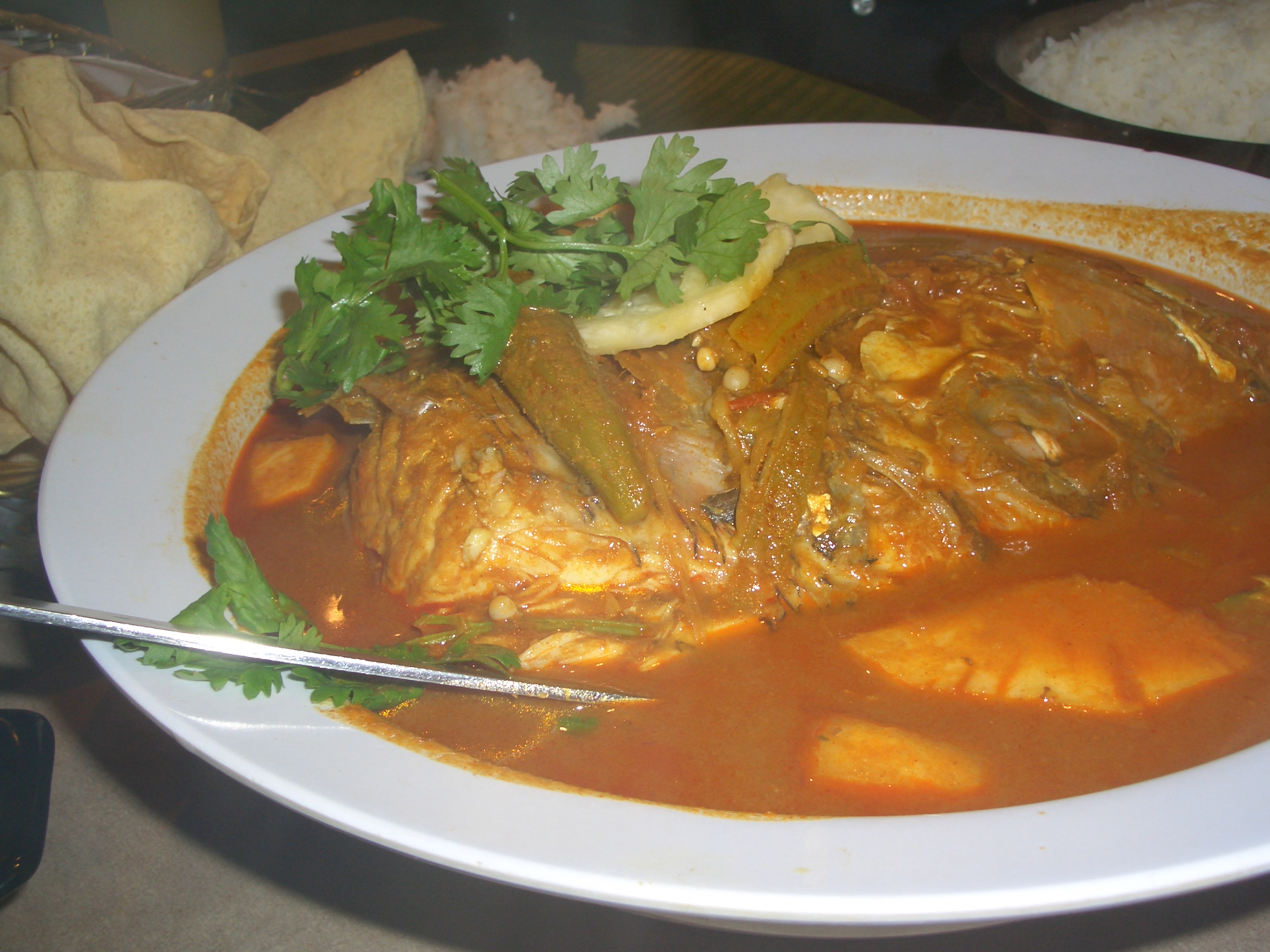
Fish head curry

The cuisine of North Bengal or North Bengali cuisine mainly represents the traditional and famous food culture of the 16 districts of the Rajshahi and Rangpur divisions of Bangladesh (Rajshahi, Bogura, Joypurhat, Chapainawabganj, Pabna, Sirajganj, Naogaon, Natore, Rangpur, Dinajpur, Gaibandha, Kurigram, Lalmonirhat, Nilphamari, Panchagarh, and Thakurgaon). Pelka, kolai ruti, ghati made with fish head, khesari kolai's bora, sidol made with taro leaves and local dried fish, food cooked with rice flour and soda or phoktai cooked with soda, or any vegetables cooked with soda called chhaka—these are special traditions of this region's culinary style. Because North Bengal of Bangladesh is culturally a region mainly influenced by Koch-Rajbongshi culture. The fame of Bogura's yogurt, known as the capital of North Bengal, is nationwide. Similarly, some notable foods like—kheer, sponge mishti, Mahasthangarh's chauler katkati, lachcha semai, seekh kebab, chicken and beef chaap, red chili, potato ghati, etc.—are also quite well-known. Since ancient times, khichuri has been common and popular in the cuisine of North Bengal.

== Kalai Roti ==
Kalai Roti is available in the Chapainawabganj district of Bangladesh. In this region, it is a widely consumed food item like fish-rice-lentil. Shops selling Kalai Roti can be seen almost everywhere in the city. Besides this district, Kalai Roti is also becoming popular in northern regions like Rajshahi, Naogaon, and even in Dhaka.

First, mashkalai and atap rice are ground into flour using a Batan or a janta (traditional stone grinders). Though Kalai Roti can be made with flour prepared by machines, the taste is enhanced when flour ground on a Batan is used. Salt as per taste and required amount of water are mixed with the flour to make a dough. Small balls are taken from the dough and shaped into circles. Then, using the palms, these are rotated and flattened to make large rotis.

Usually, Kalai Roti is thicker and larger than wheat roti. Then the roti is heated on a clay tawa (flat pan). When the color of the roti turns brown, it is taken off the heat.

Kalai Roti is generally served with mashed eggplant, mashed dried chili, bot, mashed onion, fried meat, etc. The roti is torn into pieces and eaten hot with these accompaniments.

== Pelka ==
Pelka or Pyalka is a type of soup-like food whose main ingredient is leafy greens or leaf vegetables. It is very popular in ancient North Bengal or present-day northern Bangladesh (greater Rangpur Division), as well as in the Indian districts of Jalpaiguri and Cooch Behar, and the Goalpara region of Assam.

Though it initially originated in areas where napa shak broth is eaten (such as Nilphamari district), it has now spread throughout the region. Various greens are used, such as Malva parviflora, drumstick leaves, taro leaves, Basella alba, pumpkin greens, bathua, kakri, babri, soluk, coriander, onion, garlic, chili, salt, and baking soda. However, the amount and type of ingredients may vary depending on the region or personal preference.

The different greens are cleaned and put together in a pot. Then salt, green chili, water, and a small amount of baking soda are mixed in. The pot is then covered and put on the stove to boil. It is stirred occasionally.

A notable feature of Pelka is that no oil is used in cooking it. The baking soda helps the greens cook thoroughly.

== Egg curry with water ==
Egg Curry with Water and Oil, or simply Egg Telani, is a popular egg dish from North Bengal. The ingredients used to make it are: eggs, oil, cardamom, bay leaf, cinnamon, chopped onions, ginger paste, garlic paste, green chili paste, cumin paste, an appropriate amount of water, and garam masala paste.

First, eggs are fried in oil in a pan. Then, cardamom, bay leaf, cinnamon, and chopped onions are lightly sautéed. After that, ginger paste, garlic paste, green chili paste, cumin paste, and water are mixed well in a bowl. This mixed spice paste is then poured into the frying pan or pan.

After adding the fried eggs, it's cooked for a while. Finally, when the gravy thickens, it is taken off the stove.

This egg telani can be served with hot rice, roti, paratha, or polao.
