= Grinding slab =

Prehistoric stone tool

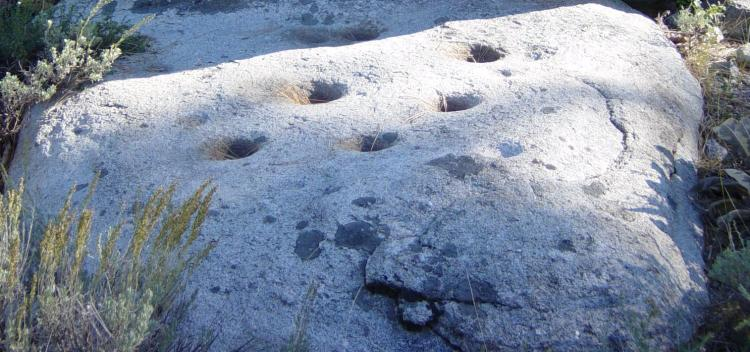
Stone slab in east-central California used to grind acorns

In archaeology, a grinding slab is a ground stone artifact generally used to grind plant materials into usable size, though some slabs were used to shape other ground stone artifacts. Some grinding stones are portable; others are not and, in fact, may be part of a stone outcropping.

Grinding slabs used for plant processing typically acted as a coarse surface against which plant materials were ground using a portable hand stone, or mano ("hand" in Spanish). Variant grinding slabs are referred to as metates or querns, and have a ground-out bowl. Like all ground stone artifacts, grinding slabs are made of large-grained materials such as granite, basalt, or similar tool stones.
