= Metate =

Mesoamerican quern or milling-stone

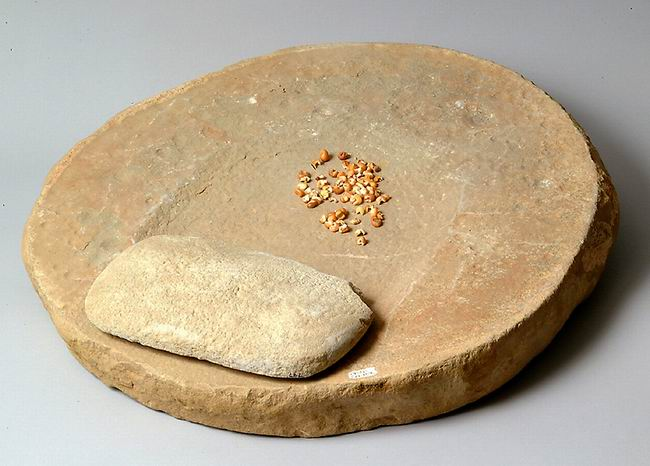
Metate, mano and corn, all circa 12th century AD, from Chaco Canyon, USA

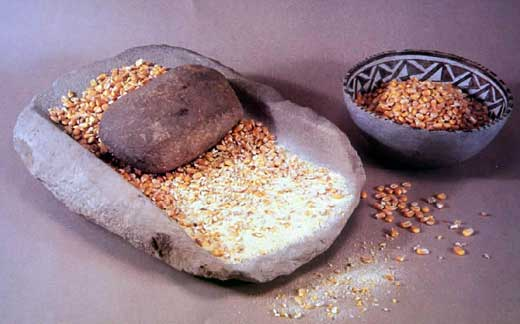
Mano, metate and bowl of corn. Museum display of Ancestral Pueblo artifacts at Mesa Verde National Park.

A metate (or mealing stone) is a type or variety of quern, a ground stone tool used for processing grain and seeds. In traditional Mesoamerican cultures, metates are typically used by women who would grind nixtamalized maize and other organic materials during food preparation (e.g., making tortillas). Similar tools are found in other regions, such as the sil-batta in Bihar and Jharkhand, India as well as other grinding stones in China.

== Design and use ==
While varying in specific morphology, metates are typically made of a large stone with a smooth depression or bowl worn into the upper surface. Materials are ground on the metate using a smooth hand-held stone known as a mano or metlapil. This action consists of a horizontal grinding motion that differs from the vertical crushing motion used in a mortar and pestle. The depth of the bowl varies, though they are typically not deeper than those of a mortar; deeper metate bowls indicate either a longer period of use or greater degree of activity (i.e., economic specialization).

The specific angles of the metate body allow for a proficient method of turning grains into flour. Lesley Téllez describes the grinding action of a metate as using "your wrists to kind of rotate the metlapil forward, while at the same time pressing downward, hard, with the palms of your hands."

Metates can be categorized by the shape of the grinding surface. One categorization identifies four such shapes: flat, flat/concave, basin, and trough. Basin-shaped metates are used with a circular grinding stroke, while flat and trough-shaped metates are used with a back-and-forth reciprocal or reciprocal-rocking stroke.

Another type of metate called a grinding slab may also be found among boulder or exposed bedrock outcroppings. The upper face of the stone is used for grinding materials, such as acorns, that results in the smoothing of the stone's face and the creation of pocked dimples.

== History ==
The use of metates is estimated to have begun in the Upper Cenolithic period in Mexico, sometime between c. 5000 BC – c. 3000 BC, and in the Middle Archaic period in the American Southwest, c. 3500 BC. The first known metates were flat or basin-shaped; trough-shaped metates came into use in the Southwest around AD 450.

Metates are still used in some areas today. For example, in parts of rural Mexico, women use metates to grind nixtamalized corn for tortillas.

== Ceremonial metates of Costa Rica ==
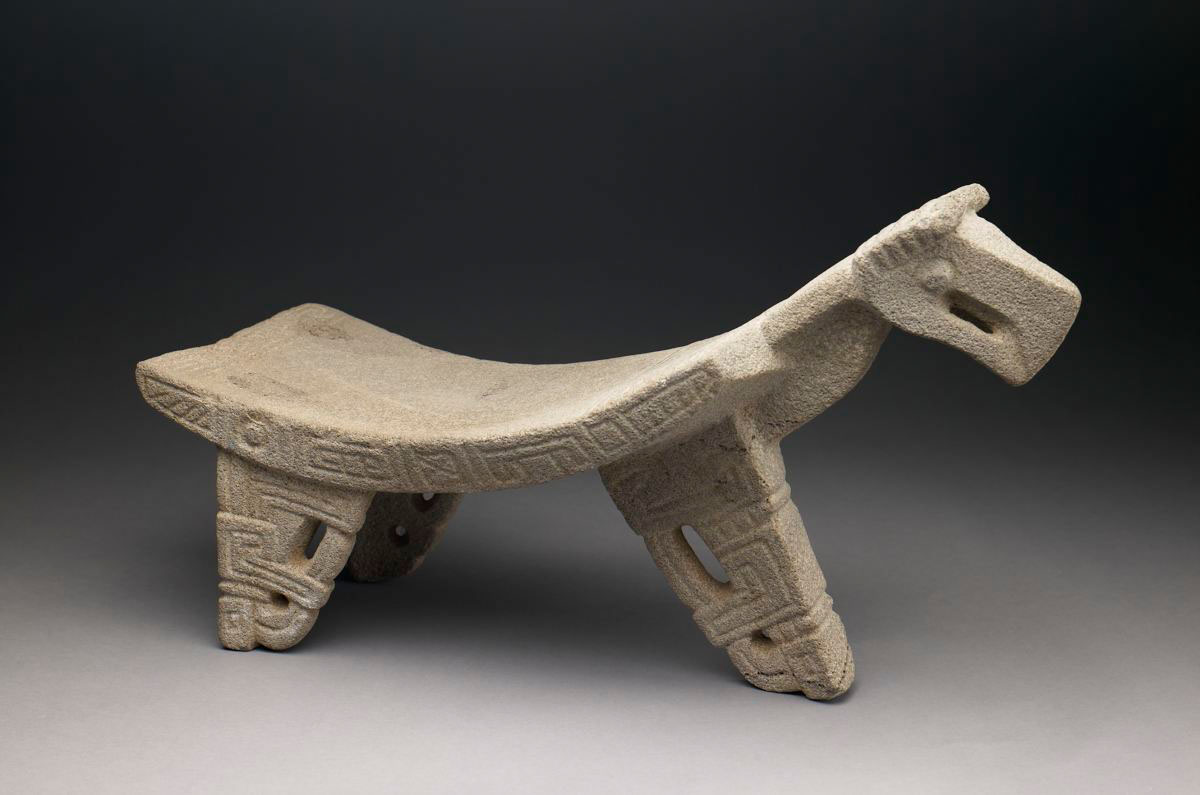
A Costa Rican metate with bird iconography at the Birmingham Museum of Art.

Carved, volcanic-stone ceremonial metates represent one of the most unusual and complex traditions of pre-Columbian artifacts from Costa Rica. They come in many different forms, and morphological variation corresponds to different regions and time periods. They can be rectangular, circular, flat, or curved. They may or may not have rims and three or four legs. Some exhibits show signs of use-wear while others show no signs of wear and appear to have been made specifically for use as burial goods. Some examples characterized as metate might have actually been a type of throne for sitting on—not a metate at all.

Some examples are known as effigy-headed metate, which feature an animal's head at one end, with the metate itself making up the body of the creature. Animals typically depicted are jaguar, crocodile or birds. The most complex type of ceremonial metate is the class referred to as "flying-panel" metate. This style comes from the Atlantic watershed region, including the City of Guayabo and represents a high level of craftsmanship and complexity. Carved from a single piece of stone, these metates typically contain multiple figures, both underneath the plate and on the legs. Trophy heads, birds, jaguar, monkey and saurian figures are the most common themes. The "flying-panel" metate is believed to be the precursor to free standing sculptural figures more common later in the Atlantic watershed region.

=== Temporal and regional variation ===
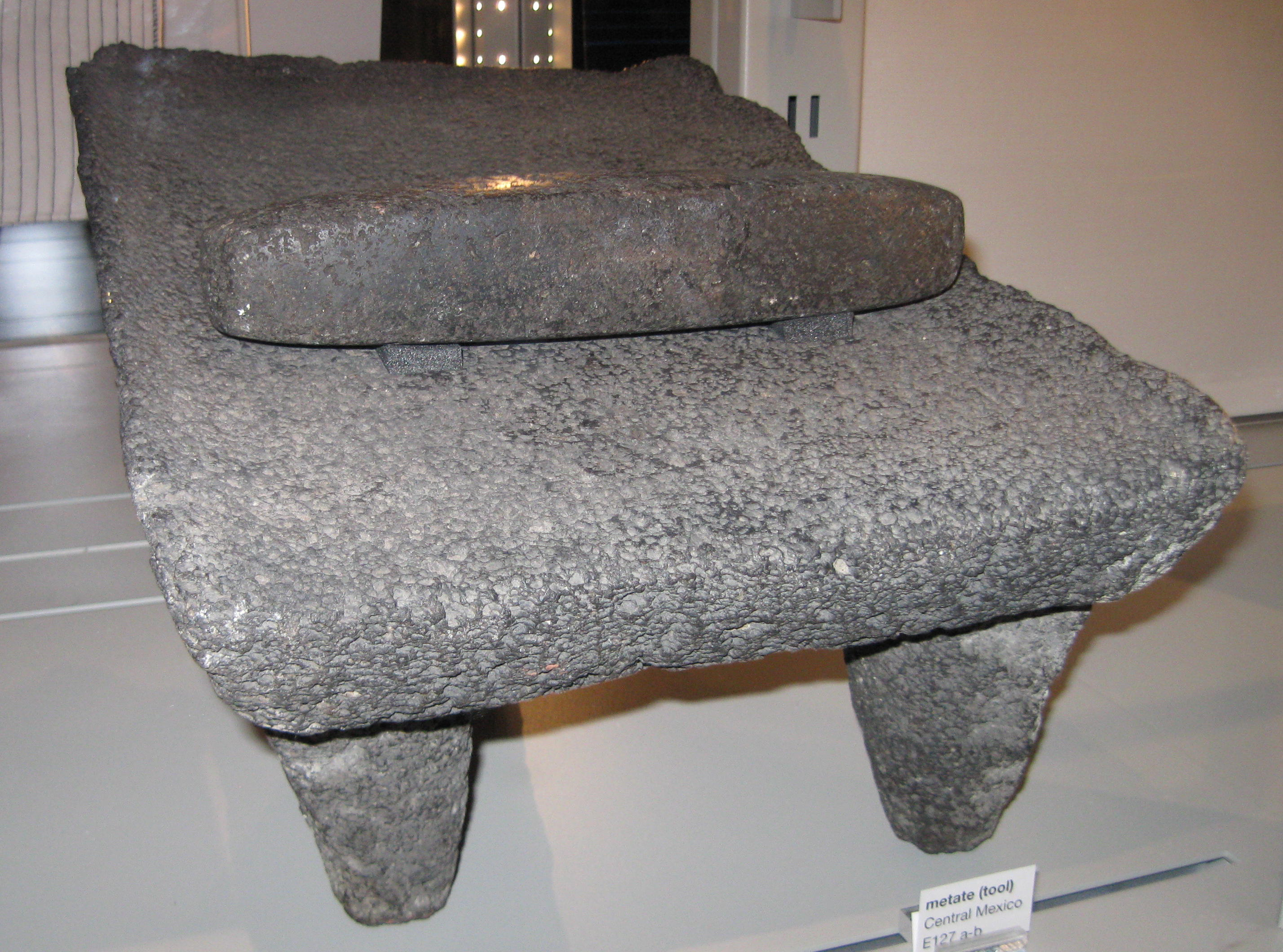
A native American grinder stone tool or 'metate' from Central Mexico.

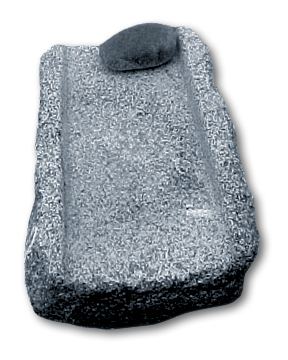
Metate and mano

The earliest traditions of stone sculpture in Costa Rica, including ceremonial metate, began in late Period IV (A.D. 1–500). Metate from the Nicoya/Guanacaste region have longitudinally curved and rimless plates. Those from the Atlantic Watershed have a plate that is horizontally flat and rimmed. Both are associated with mortuary goods, suggesting differential social status existed within these communities. The three main types of Costa Rican stone sculpture at this time—tripod-metate, mace heads and jade "axe-god" pendants—peaked and declined in use during Period V (A.D. 500–1000).

Stone sculpture was never popular again in the Nicoya/Guanacaste region, but in the Atlantic Watershed (such as from Guayabo) by Period VI (A.D. 1000–1500), freestanding figural sculpture and new forms of ceremonial metate came into use. These new metate types might be rectangular with four legs like the jaguar effigy-head examples or might be round in shape with a pedestal base. These latter types often have carved human heads (or just suggestive notches) around the rim implying a relationship with ritual trophy-head taking. This particular form of metate seems to have been influenced by the stone sculptures of the Panamanian site of Barriles.

At the site of Las Huacas, fifteen metates were excavated from sixteen graves. None of these metates had manos (grinding stones), suggesting that the carved metate as a mortuary object had a deeper symbolic meaning than just the processing of foodstuffs. The metate's basic mechanical purpose is a platform on which (primarily) maize is ground into flour. This transformation of grain to flour has symbolic implications relating to life, death and rebirth. It is still not clear if maize was a main source of sustenance, and it is entirely possible that maize was reserved for making chicha (beer), for use in ritual feasting activities. Given their role as a burial good, it seems that metate held a strong meaning for human life, death and the hope for a rebirth or transformation of some kind.

=== Iconography ===
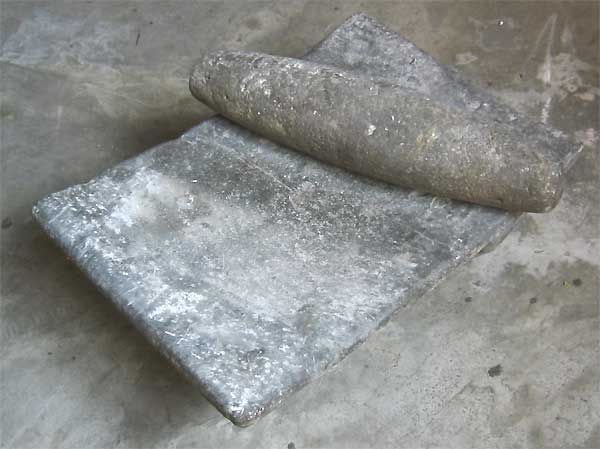
Two items commonly used by indigenous Mexicans. The mortar is called a metate and the stone lying across it a mano. It is held in both hands and used to grind corn, cacao and other basic foods.

The three most popular iconographic elements of ceremonial metate seem to be saurian, bird, and jaguar creatures. Monkeys are also common. A unique feature of ceremonial metate is the lack of human figures. Disembodied heads are the sole exception. While human figures become the main subject of the free standing sculptures, which depict nude females or male warriors with trophy heads and bound male captives, these do not seem to have been depicted on metate. Flying-panel metates often have anthropomorphic figures, but these always have animal (often crocodile) heads.

In both the Nicoya and Atlantic-Watershed regions, metates are often made with saurian (specifically crocodile, alligator, or caiman) imagery. It is thought that the saurian represents the surface of the earth, which relates to agricultural fertility. One of the oldest and most prominent themes in Chibcha art is that of the Crocodile god. Depicted as an anthropomorphic being with a crocodile head, he has been carved into fly-panel metates, sometimes shown standing on a double-headed saurian and other times on a jaguar. As a symbol, the double-headed Saurian has the longest use and distribution of any iconographic element in the Isthmo-Columbian area.

Costa Rica flying-panel metates date to the 1st and 7th centuries. However, certain features of the Crocodile god depicted on flying-panel metates show him with unnatural U-shaped elbows and long, narrow fingers, as seen on crocodile gods made in gold that date to the 10th–16th centuries. These stylistic forms make sense for use in the small gold ornaments made with the lost-wax technique, but seem strange for use in carved stone. Perhaps these metates date much later than previously thought, and were inspired by the depictions in gold.

Birds with long, curving beaks that seem to represent vultures, toucans or maybe hummingbirds are another popular theme. First found in Costa Rica on Pavas and El Bosque-phase pottery, these are a common element in flying-panel metates, sometimes depicted with or pecking at human heads.

== Collections ==
The largest collection is in the National Museum of Costa Rica. A collection of over 20 metates can be found in the British Museum.

== Gallery ==
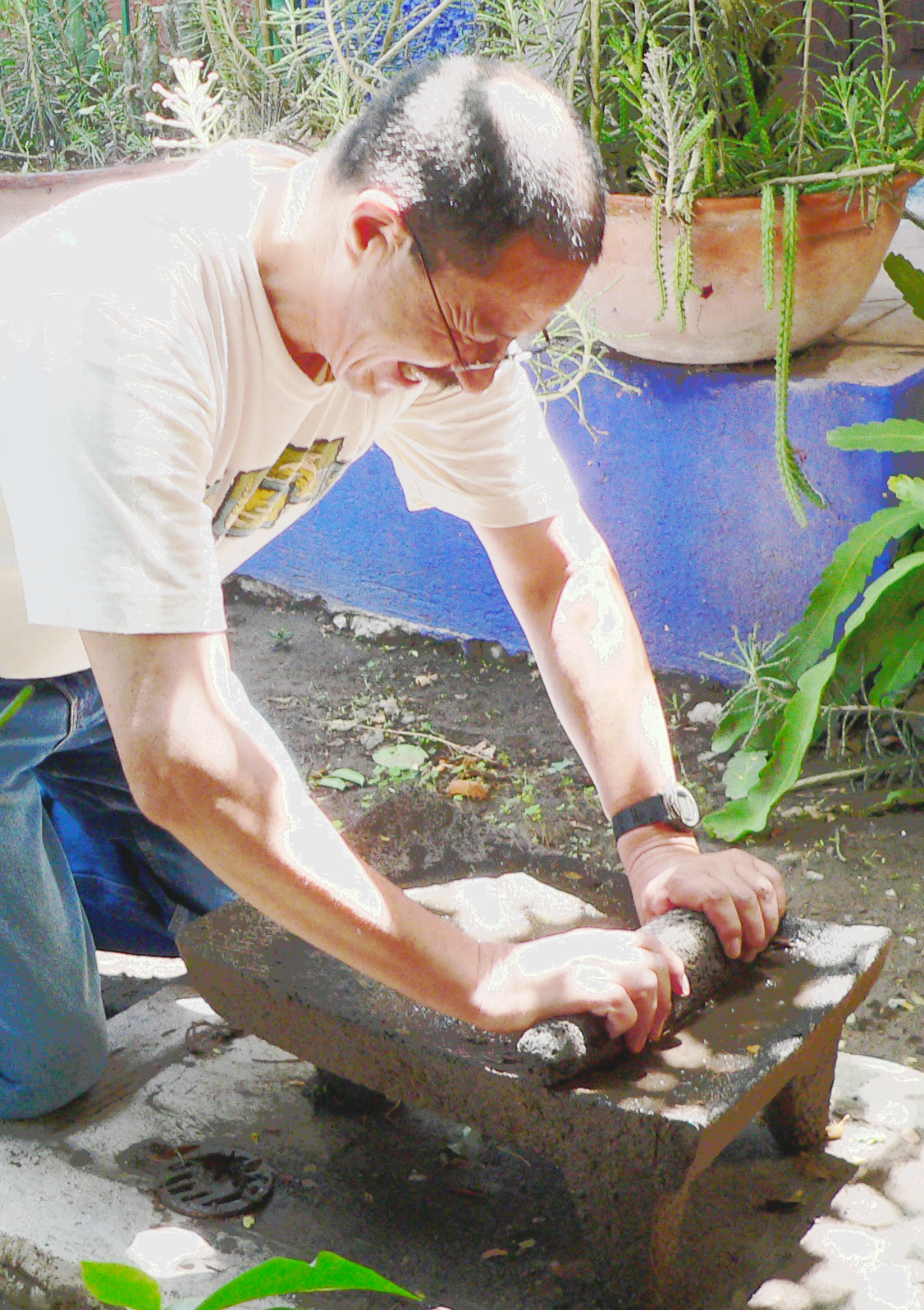
Use of a Mexican metate

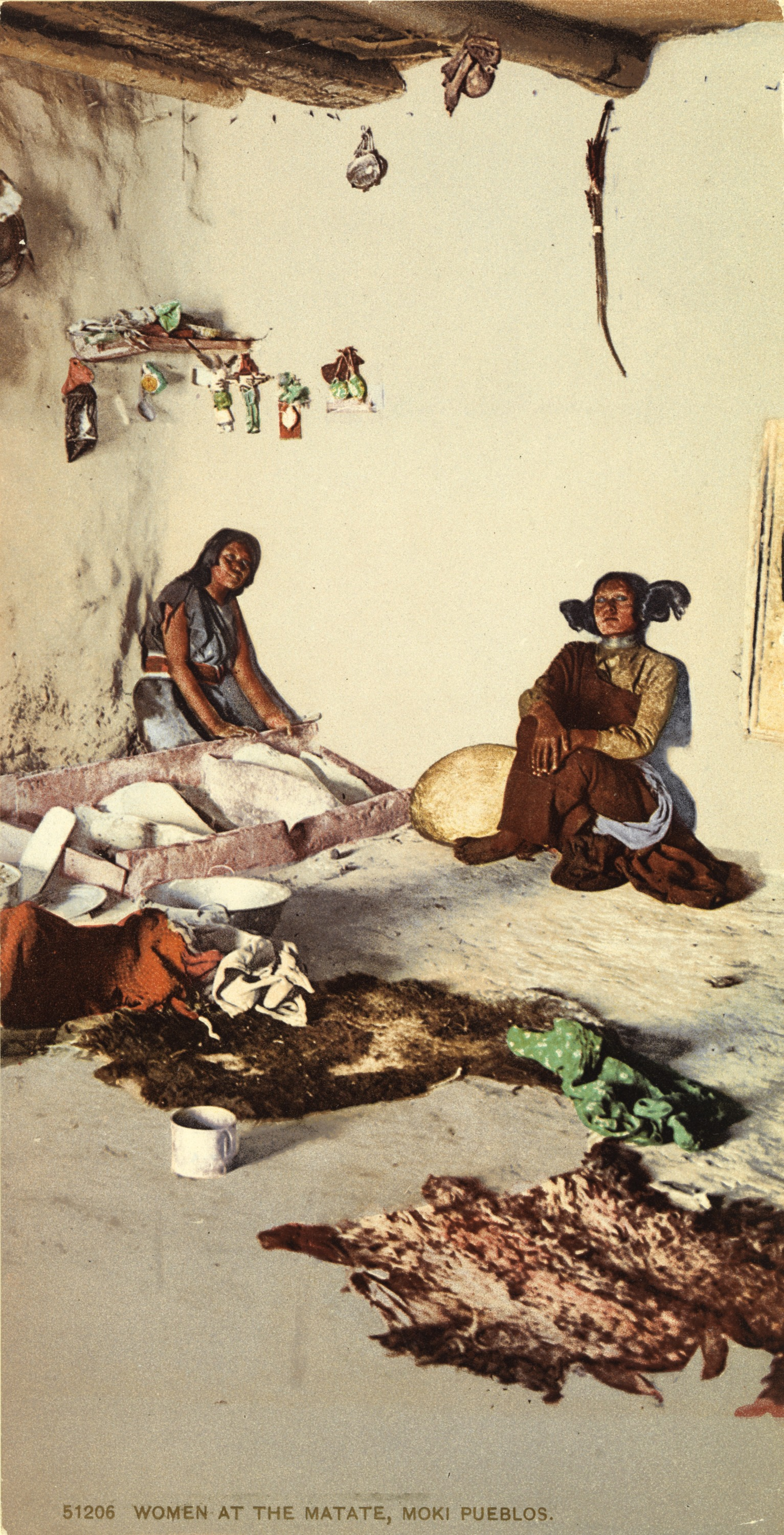
Women at the Matate, Moki Pueblos, c. 1900

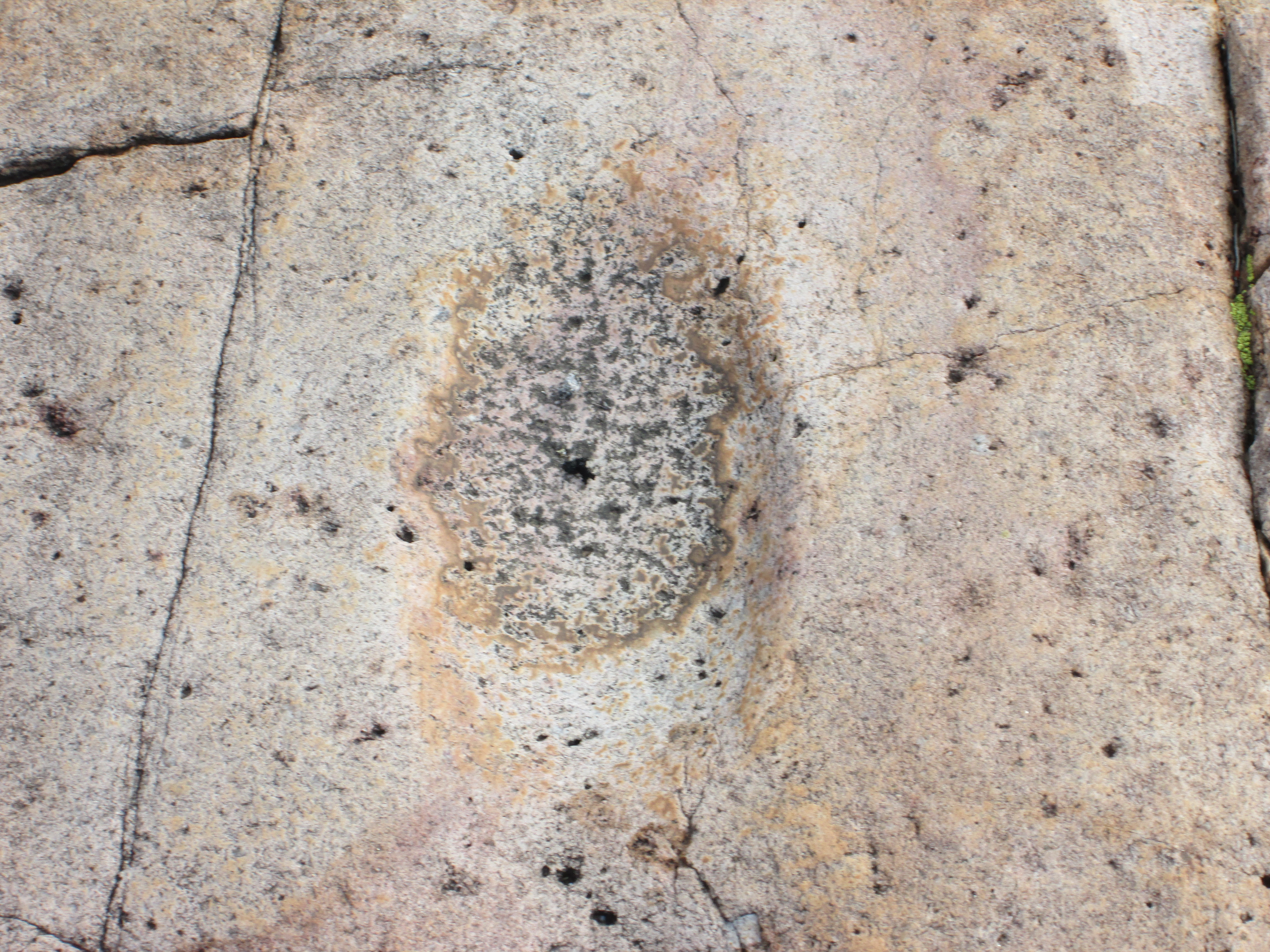
Native American bedrock metate at Huerfano Butte, Arizona

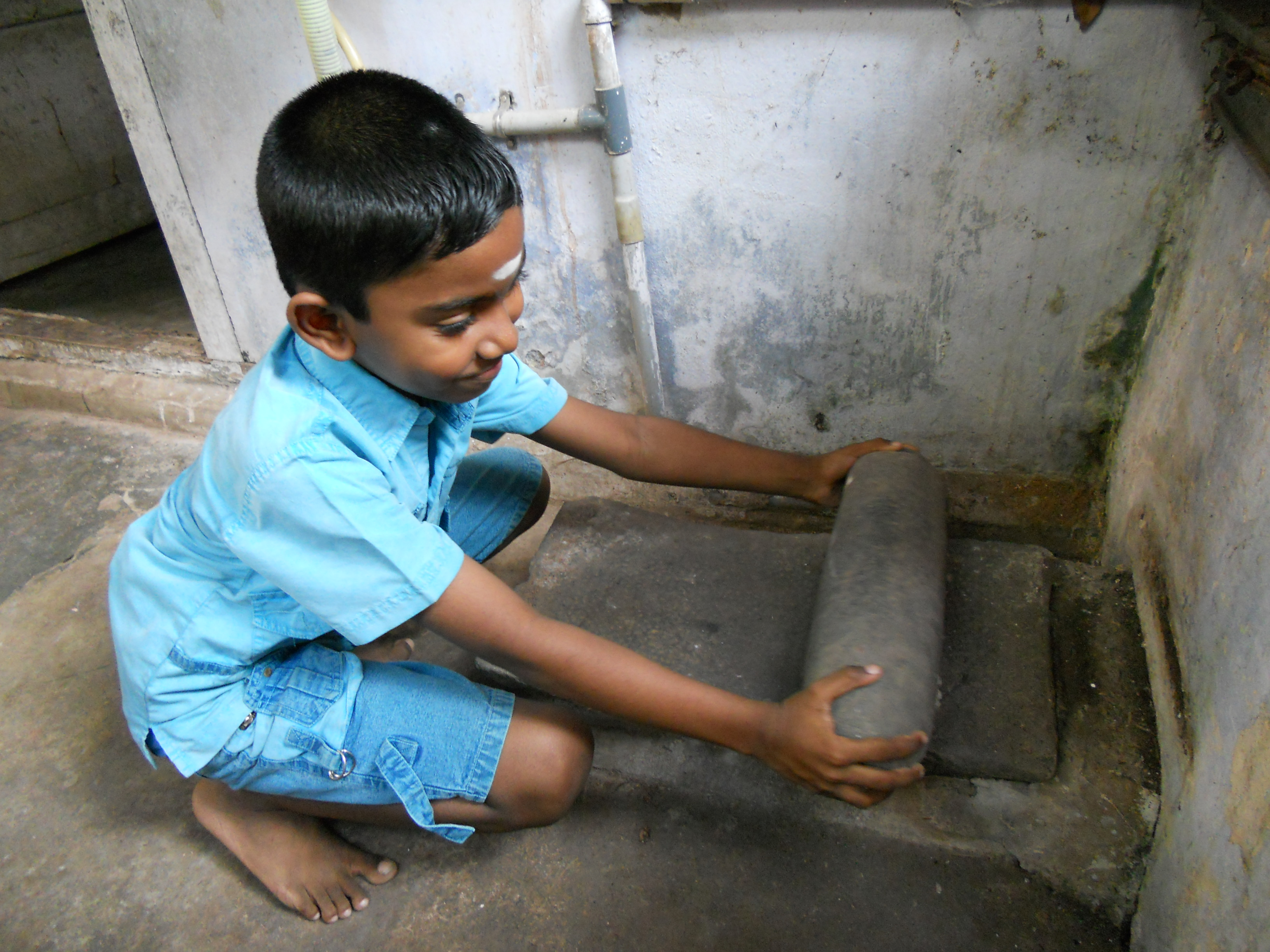
Use of a metate in India

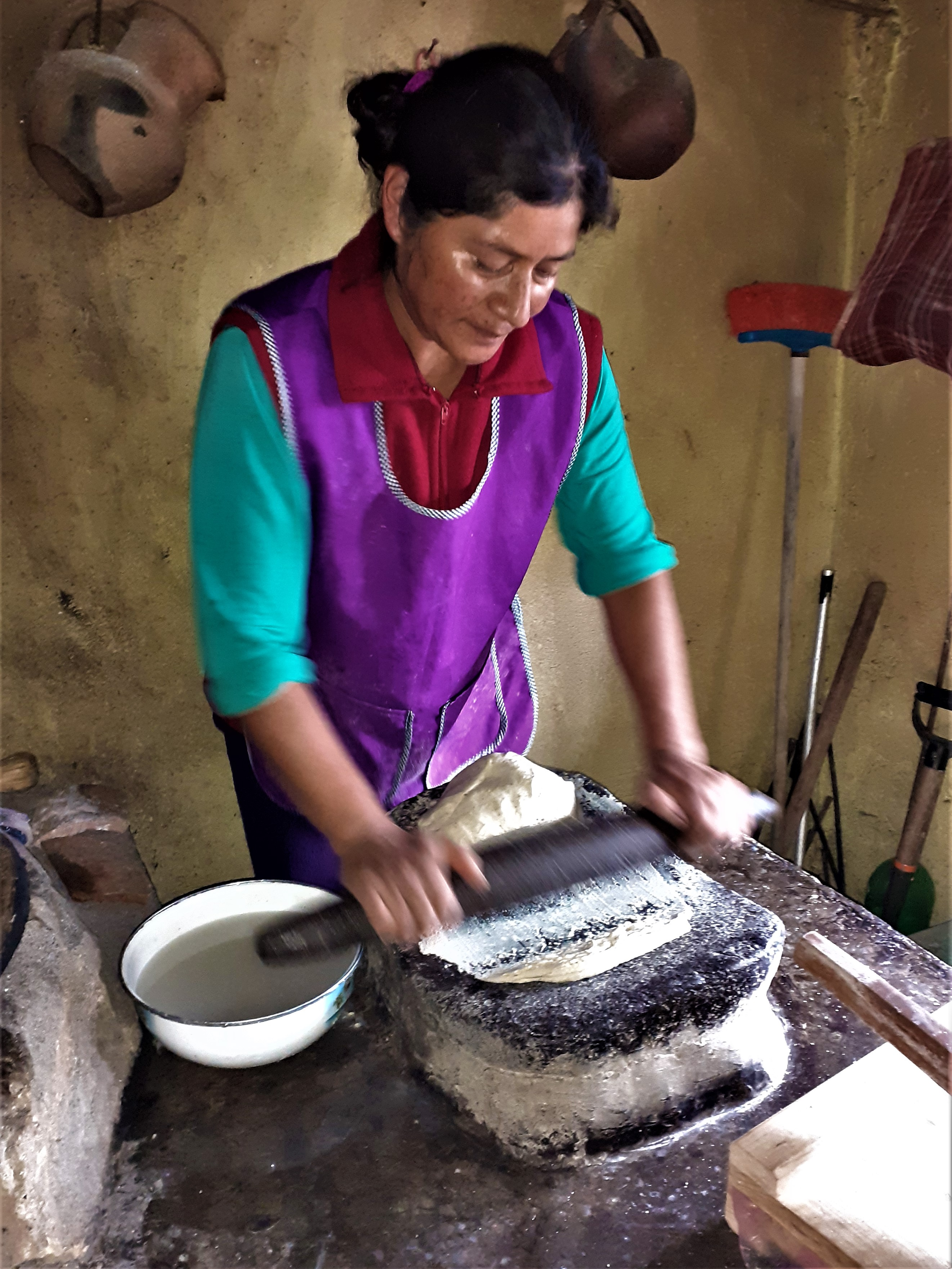
Isabel Nicolás, a Ñuu Savi (Mixtec) woman grinding corn dough in the yooso (metate in Mixtec) when making tortillas. San Juan Achiutla, Oaxaca, México, 2020.

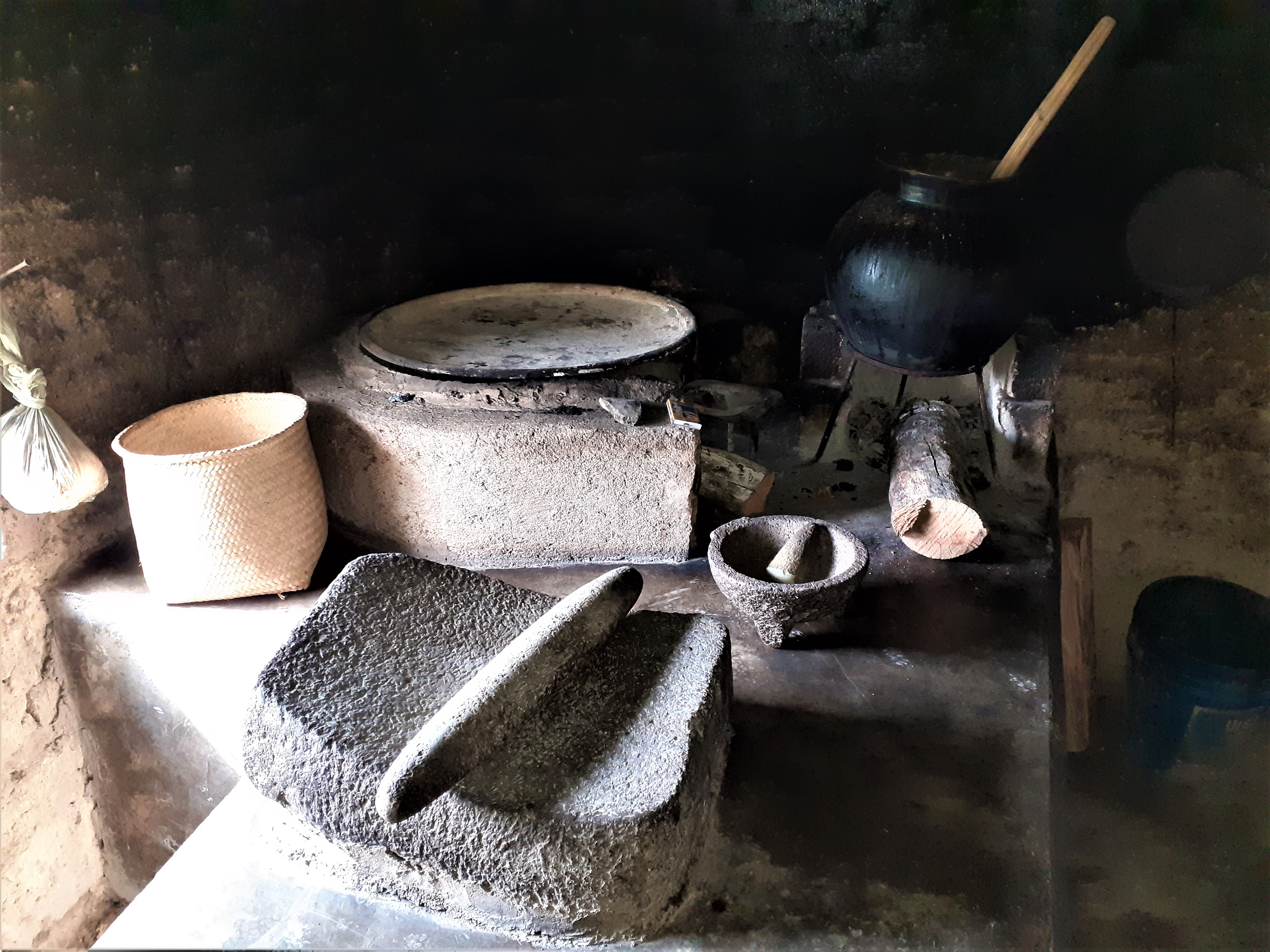
Contemporary indigenous kitchen with metate in the foreground, comal, palm tenate, molcajete (stone mortar) and a clay pot. San Juan Achiutla, Oaxaca, México, 2020.

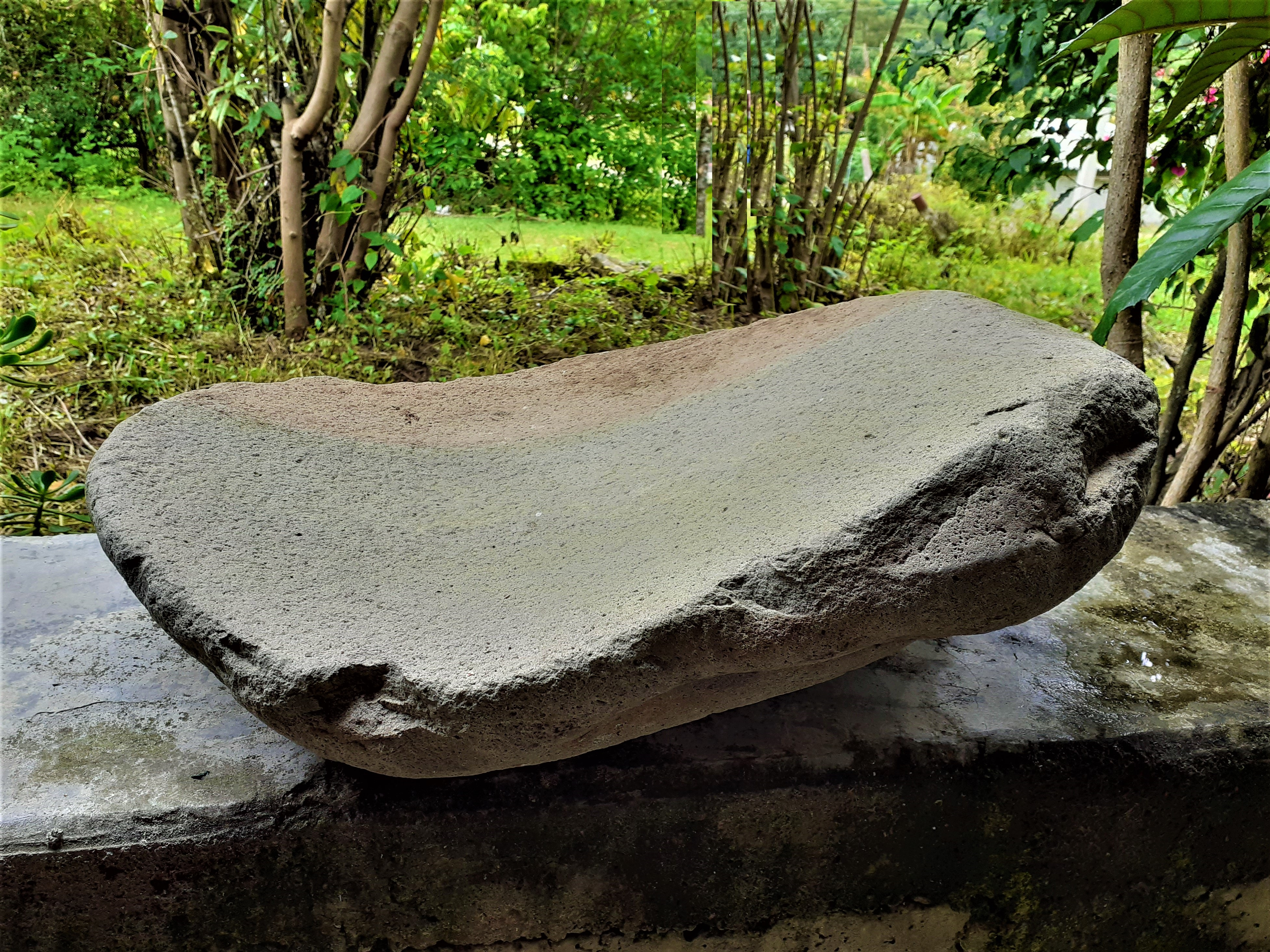
Pre-Columbian Mixtec metate. San Juan Achiutla, Oaxaca, México. 2020.

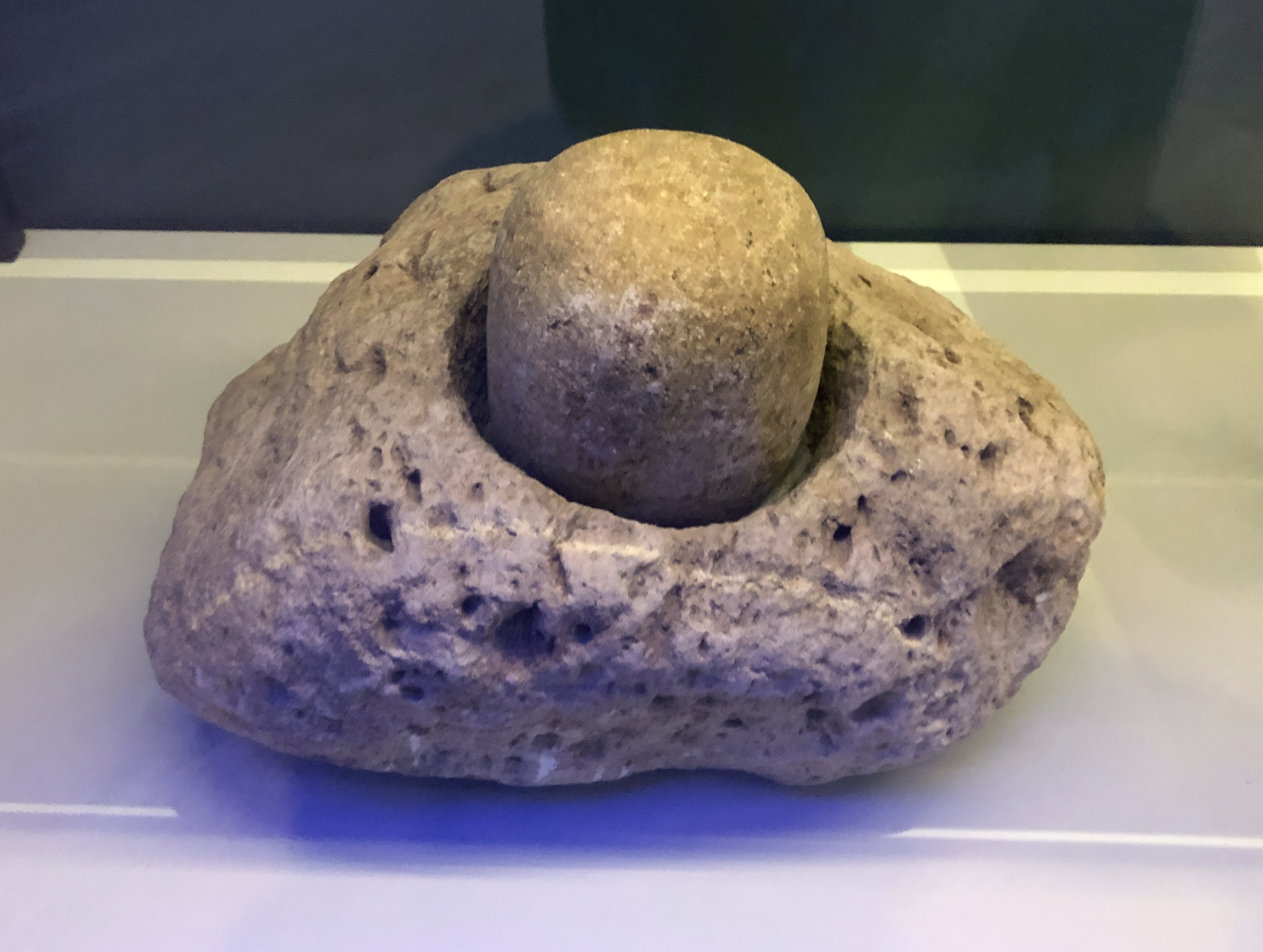
Stone mortar and pestle, AD 900–1300, Spurgeon Draw site, Catron County, New Mexico

== See also ==
- Agriculture in Mesoamerica
- Batan
- Category: Native American cuisine
- Grain grinding wheel
- Household stone implements in Karnataka
- Maya diet and subsistence
- Molcajete
- Mortar and pestle
- Stone and muller
