= Household stone implements in Karnataka =

Use of domestic stone tools in India

Household stone implements in Karnataka, India used for wet grinding, dry grinding and pounding are oralu kallu, beeso kallu, dundagallu and kutni.

== Pronunciation ==
In Kannada, the official and chief language of Karnataka, oralu kallu is written as ಒರಳು ಕಲ್ಲು. The pronunciation of ‘lu’ in Oralu is not the same as ‘lu’ in "flu". 'Lu' of Oralu Kallu is depicted as ‘ḷu’ in equivalent English. Oralu is a Kannada word for turn, which here describes the action of gundukallu, a grinding stone. ‘Kallu’ is a Kannada word for stone. An alternate name, rubbo kallu, is written as ರುಬ್ಬೊ ಕಲ್ಲು. ‘Rubbu’ is a Kannada word for grinding.

Beeso kallu is written as ಬೀಸೋ ಕಲ್ಲು. Beesu is a Kannada word for dry grinding.

Dundugallu is written as ದುಂಡುಗಲ್ಲು. ‘Dundu’ is a Kannada word for round which here describes the shape of the stone. It is also called rubbo dundi (ರುಬ್ಬೂ ದುಂಡಿ).

Kutni is written as ಕುಟ್ನಿ. ‘Kuttu’ is a Kannada word for pounding.

== Oralu kallu ==
=== Description ===
Oralu kallu or rubbo kallu is a household stone implement used for wet grinding. It consists of two separate parts. A grinding stone called gundukallu (ಗುಂಡುಕಲ್ಲು)/gootada kallu (ಗೂಟದಕಲ್ಲು) is a stout cylindrical stone of rounded ends with or without a wooden handle, and a base stone which actually is called oralu kallu has a central well with a diameter slightly larger than the gundukallu.

=== Wet grinding ===
Gundukallu is placed in the well of a base stone and rotated, usually with the left hand while the right hand is used to regularly push ingredients towards the well to grind them. The role of the hands keep interchanging with fatigue, duration and quantity of grinding.

=== Uses ===
- To wet grind dosa/idli batters, various chutneys, masalas etc.
- It is a preferred tool to grind uddina vada batter in hotels and restaurants.
- For making chigali
- It plays an important role in Arishina Kuttuva Shastra (details under Miscellaneous section below), a wedding ritual in southern India.

=== Current scenario ===
Oralu kallu used to be a standard fixture of every household in the past. They were mounted flush with the kitchen floor or built into counters or as separate stone unit within or outside homes. With the availability and convenience of mixer grinders, food processors, and commercial wet grinders, the oralu kallu has almost disappeared from urban areas and is on the decline in rural areas. Some believe that foods prepared using an oralu kallu taste better than foods processed in mixer grinders.

== Beeso kallu ==
=== Description ===
Beeso kallu is a household stone implement for dry grinding millet. It is made of two thick circular flat stones on top of each other. The upper stone has a central hole which accommodates a small conical (metal/stone) projection from stone below about which it can rotate. Also, on the upper stone is another hole, peripheral in location, which houses a wooden handle for rotating it. It is also called as chakki (stone mill) in northern India.

A Kannada folk song about Beeso Kallu

=== Dry grinding ===
Ingredients to be ground are poured through the central hole of the upper stone which then slides along the sides of metal/stone projecting from below into a gap between the upper and lower stone. There it gets ground to flour upon rotating the upper stone.

Beeso kallu, called jato in Nepal

=== Uses ===
- For making flour from millet like rice, ragi, wheat, jowar etc.
- Sometimes powders like chili powder, sambar powder and other masala powders are also ground in it.

=== Current scenario ===
This was the chief tool of the past to grind millet into flour before the spread of commercial grinding mill shops. Hitherto found in rural areas, these have now almost disappeared.

== Dundugallu ==
=== Description ===
Dundugallu is a household stone implement for wet grinding found mostly in rural areas. It is a very basic form of an implement consisting of two separate parts, a circular or cylindrical or oval stone and another flat surfaced stone. It is seen in various sizes from small to large.

=== Wet grinding ===
Before grinding, both parts are washed and cleaned. Ingredients to be ground are placed on flat surfaced stone. Heavy round or cylindrical or oval stone is then rolled to and fro on the ingredients to grind them.

=== Uses ===
- Used in wet grinding ingredients for masalas, chutneys etc.

=== Current scenario ===
Hitherto found in rural areas, these have now almost disappeared.

== Kutni ==
=== Description ===
Kutni is a miniature household stone implement for grinding small quantities of either dry or wet ingredients. It traditionally is made of stone. It consists of kutni, a roughly boat or circular shaped base stone with shallow upper surface, and a kutto kallu (ಕುಟ್ಟೋ ಕಲ್ಲು), a roughly pear shaped small stone to pound/crush/grind.

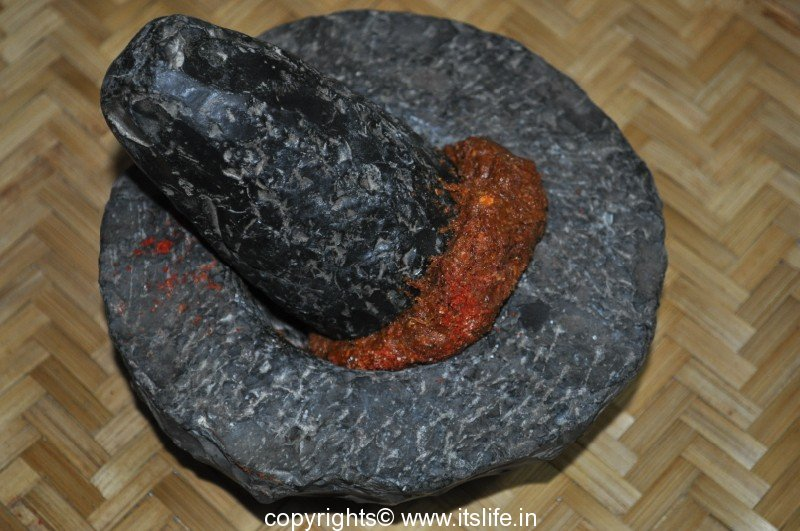
Kutni used for making chigali

=== Dry or wet grinding ===
Ingredients to be ground are placed in the kutni and the kutto kallu is used to crush/pound/grind.

=== Uses ===
- Usually to coarse powder small quantities of spices like cinnamon, cloves, cardamom etc.
- To crush black pepper
- To make small quantities of menasinkai (chilli) / bendekai (okra) and other chutneys
- To make chigali

=== Current scenario ===
Kutni in the English world is known as a mortar and pestle. They are available in various sizes and shapes. Traditionally they were made of stone. Currently they are made in various sizes and shapes, from materials like iron, steel, brass, alloys, wood, marble stone, granite, or plastic. They are found in almost every household.

== Miscellaneous ==
=== Arishina Kuttuva Shastra ===
Arishina Kuttuva Shastra (ಅರಿಶಿನ ಕುಟ್ಟುವ ಶಾಸ್ತ್ರ) is an important wedding ritual in Southern India. Arishina is a Kannada word for turmeric. In the ritual, whole turmeric (dried whole unbroken tuber) is placed in the oralu kallu. Women use the onake (description below) to pound it to a powder. Powdered turmeric is made into a paste with water. Turmeric paste is then applied on the bride and groom. In northern India, the Haldi function is similar.

In another wedding ritual, instead of turmeric, various other grains like rice and jowar are symbolically pounded by the bride.

=== Onake ===
Onake is a wooden pole/stick, about the length of an average person, used in the past to pound millets into flour. Millet to be pounded is placed in the oralukallu and pounded with onake to flour. Currently, its usage is mostly limited to the Arishina Kuttuva ritual in South Indian weddings. The onake is sometimes called a pestle in English.

A historical, brave woman, Obavva killed enemy soldiers with an onake in a battle at Chitradurga fort. She is revered as Onake Obavva. She is exemplified for the bravery and courage of women of Karnataka alongside another historical ruler, Kittur Chennamma.

=== Murders ===
Gundukallu, the grinding stone of oralu kallu, has been used as a weapon in numerous murders. Rarely, in domestic quarrels or family feuds or fights with neighbours or in village fights, a threat made by one individual to another can be heard said as "gundukallu yattak bidtini" (ಗುಂಡುಕಲ್ಲು ಯತ್ತಾಕ್ಬಿಡ್ತೀನಿ), which can be translated roughly as "will lift up the grinding stone and throw it on you".

== See also ==
- Ground stone
- Metate
- Batan (stone)
