= Chigali =

Indian tamarand snack

ಚಿಗಳಿ
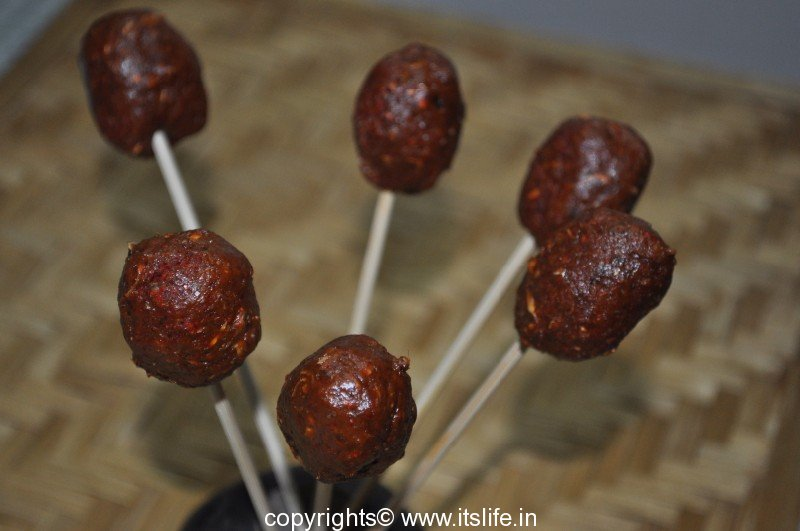
- Alternative names: Imli ki Goli
- Type: Dessert
- Place of origin: India
- Main ingredients: Tamarind
- Ingredients generally used: Jaggery; Sugar; Salt; Chili powder; Lemon leaves; Asafoetida; Cumin seeds; Ghee; Garlic; Black pepper

Chigali (Kannada: ಚಿಗಳಿ) is a popular tangy tamarind treat usually made in Southern India, especially in the state of Karnataka. Chigali is also referred to as Imli ki Goli in Northern India. Chigali has been introduced into the Indian FMCG market under the brand name "Chicley".

== Preparation and ingredients ==
The chief ingredient, tamarind, is combined with other ingredients (listed below) and pounded in a kutni (Kannada: ಕುಟ್ನಿ, mortar and pestle in English) or in an oralukallu, which gives the mixture an even consistency. This mixture is then rolled between the palms of the hand to make small round balls. Next, if preferred, these balls can be stuck on sticks, toothpicks, straws, or spoon handles. In supermarkets and malls, chigali can be found wrapped in thin transparent covers as chigali candies.

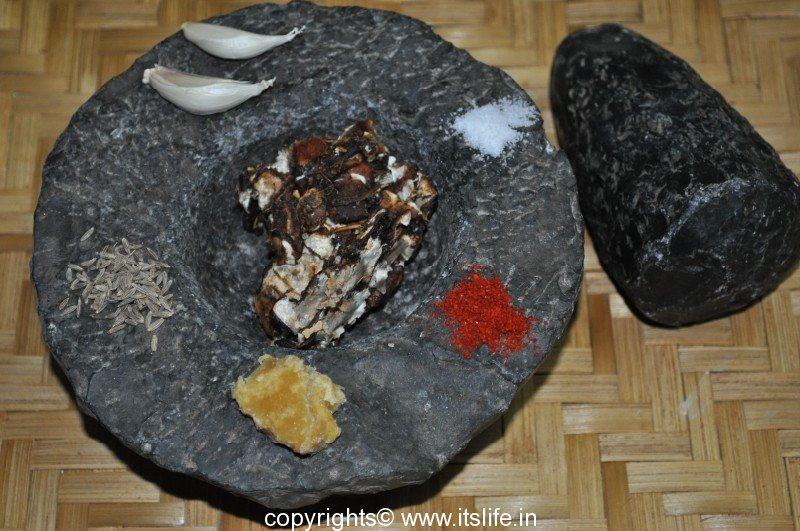
Chigali ingredients for pounding in 'Kutni'

Ingredients may include any combination of:

- Tamarind
- Jaggery
- Sugar
- Salt
- Chili powder
- Lemon leaves
- Asafoetida
- Cumin seeds
- Ghee or any vegetable oil
- Garlic
- Black pepper

== Others with similar names ==
- Chigali Unde/Undi - A sweet dish also called Yellunde in Karnataka made with Ellu (black sesame seeds) and jaggery.

== See also ==
- Household stone implements in Karnataka for details of Oralukallu and Kutni
