= Batan (stone) =

Kitchen utensil

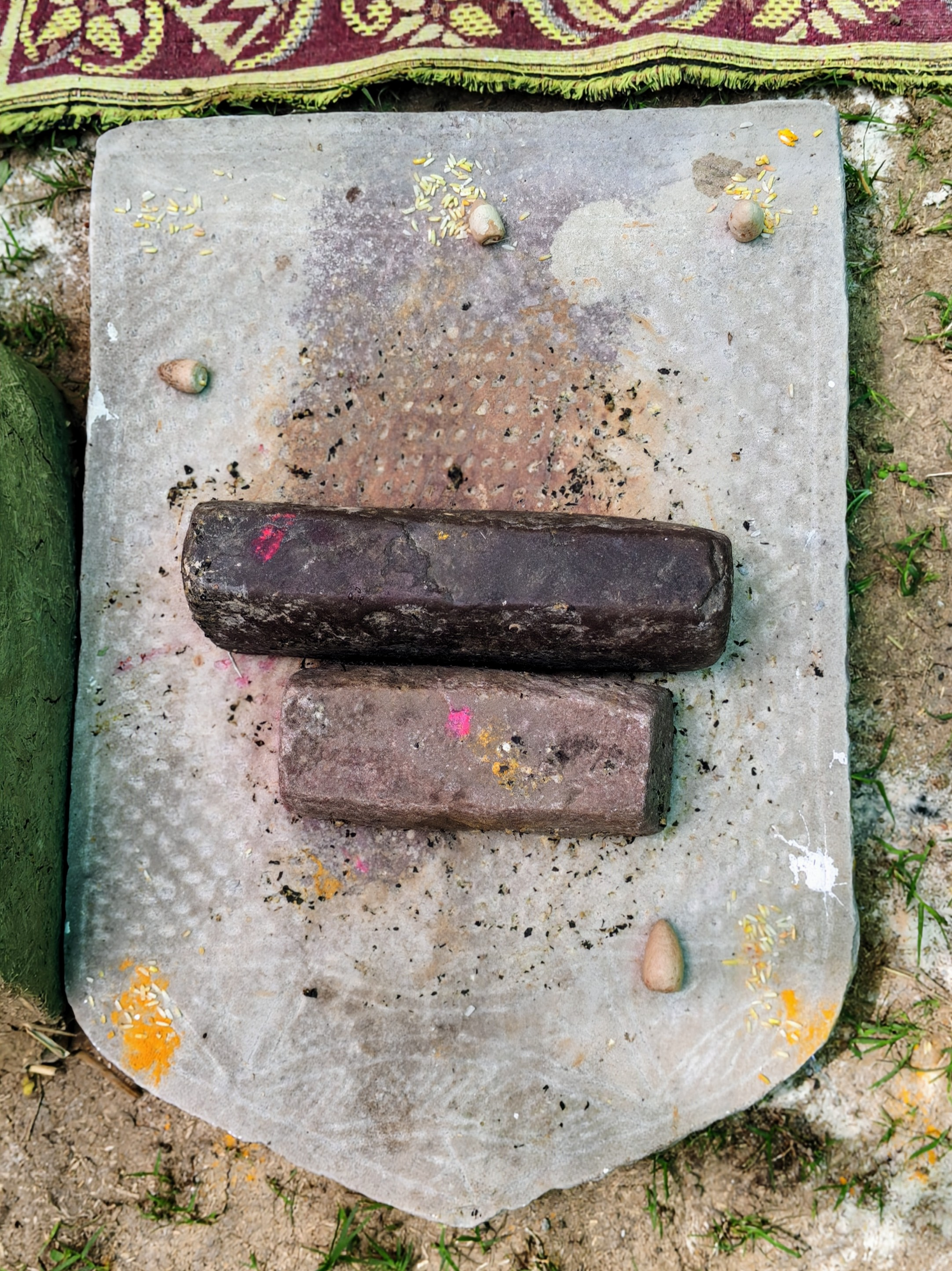
Traditional Stone Sil-Batta from India

The batán (also known as the silbatta in the Indian subcontinent) is a kitchen utensil used to process different kinds of food in South American, Indian and Andean cuisine. It has a flat stone (Spanish: batán; Hindi: सिल, sil) and a grinding stone (Spanish: uña; Hindi: बट्टा, batta). The uña is held in both hands and rocked over the food in the batán. Depending on the use, the uña's weight can be slightly held back, allowed to move freely, or used to apply additional pressure. The rocking movements also vary depending on the application, and the grinding is done dry or with water or oil.

== South America ==
The batán has been used since before the arrival of Spaniards in South America. In Andean households many different dishes are prepared in this manner, in rural and urban areas. The most important use it has is for preparing llajwa. For many Bolivians, Peruvians, Ecuadoreans and Colombians it is not the same when done in a blender.

It is also used to husk grains, wash quinoa from its alkaloid (saponin), grind grains, crush papalisa and even to prepare small quantities of flour.

== South Asia (Indian subcontinent) ==
The silbatta (Hindi: सिलबट्टा, Malayalam: അമ്മി, romanized: ammi kallu, Tamil: அம்மி, romanized: ammi kallu, Marathi:pata-varvanta, Bengali: shil nora; Odia: sila puaa ; also called sil nora) is used in many Indian households. In Odisha, it is also worshipped as Bhu Devi or mother Earth during traditional Odia weddings and the Raja festival. It is traditionally used to grind spices and lentils in the states of Tamil Nadu and Kerala. These grinding stones are primarily used to prepare chutney and spice mixes for cooking and occasional use including grinding soaked lentils in preparation for dosas, vadas, or papadum.

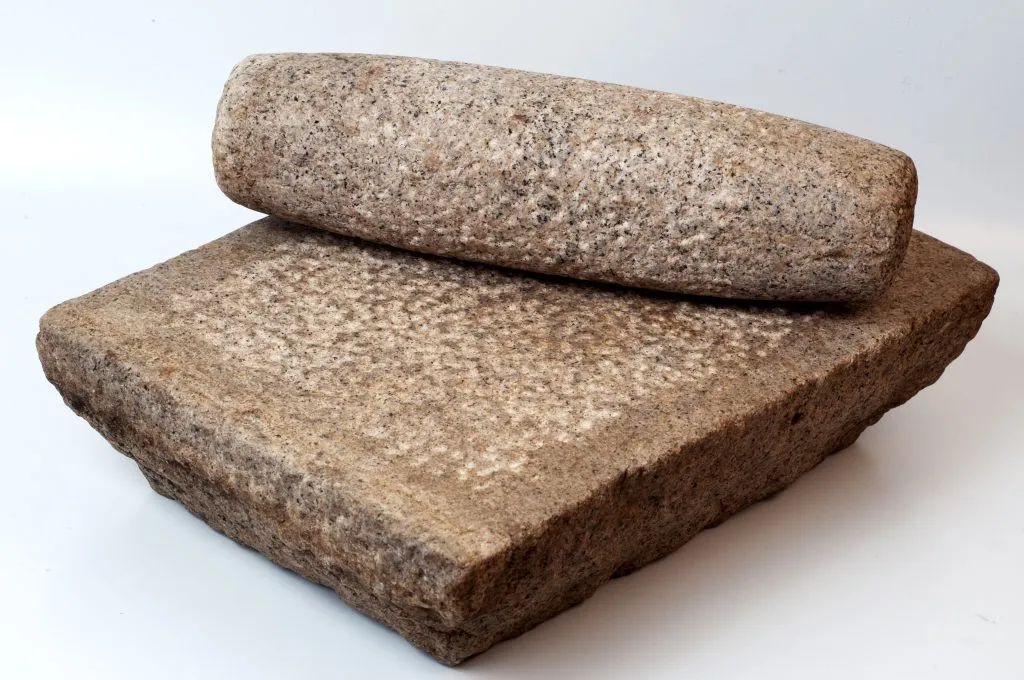
Sil with round batta.

The batta is held with both hands and moved back and forth (rolled, rocked) over the sil. The rocking moment vary depending upon the application and either the grinding is done dry or wet.

In Nepal, it is known as silauto-lohoro with silauto referring to flat stone and lohoro referring to a cylindrical grinding stone.

=== History ===
The silbatta dates to as early as 2500 BC. A simplified excavated specimen dated to the Indus Valley or the Indus-Saraswati civilization is showcased in the National Museum of History, Delhi.

Seals found from this civilization depict four types of silbatta or simple grinding stones, each used for a different purpose, such as religious activities or cooking.

Shri K T Achaya in his book, A Historical Dictionary of Indian Food mentions stone units used during the Neolithic era. One had a circular depression in which grains were crushed using a ‘rounded stone held in one hand’. The other was flat-ish that paired with a ‘cylindrical muller rolled with both hands’.

== Gallery ==
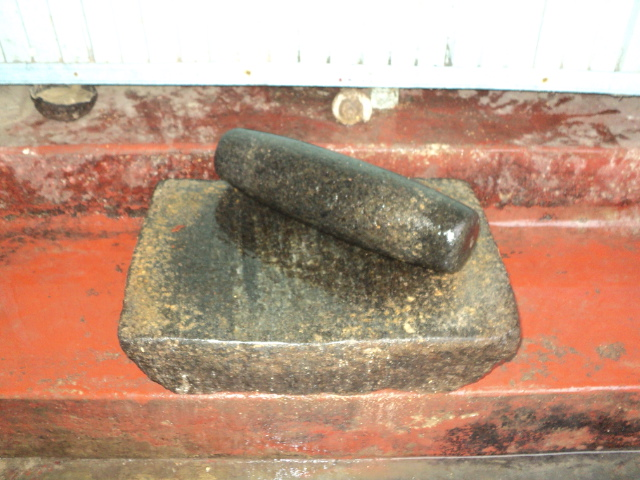
Ammi kallu in India

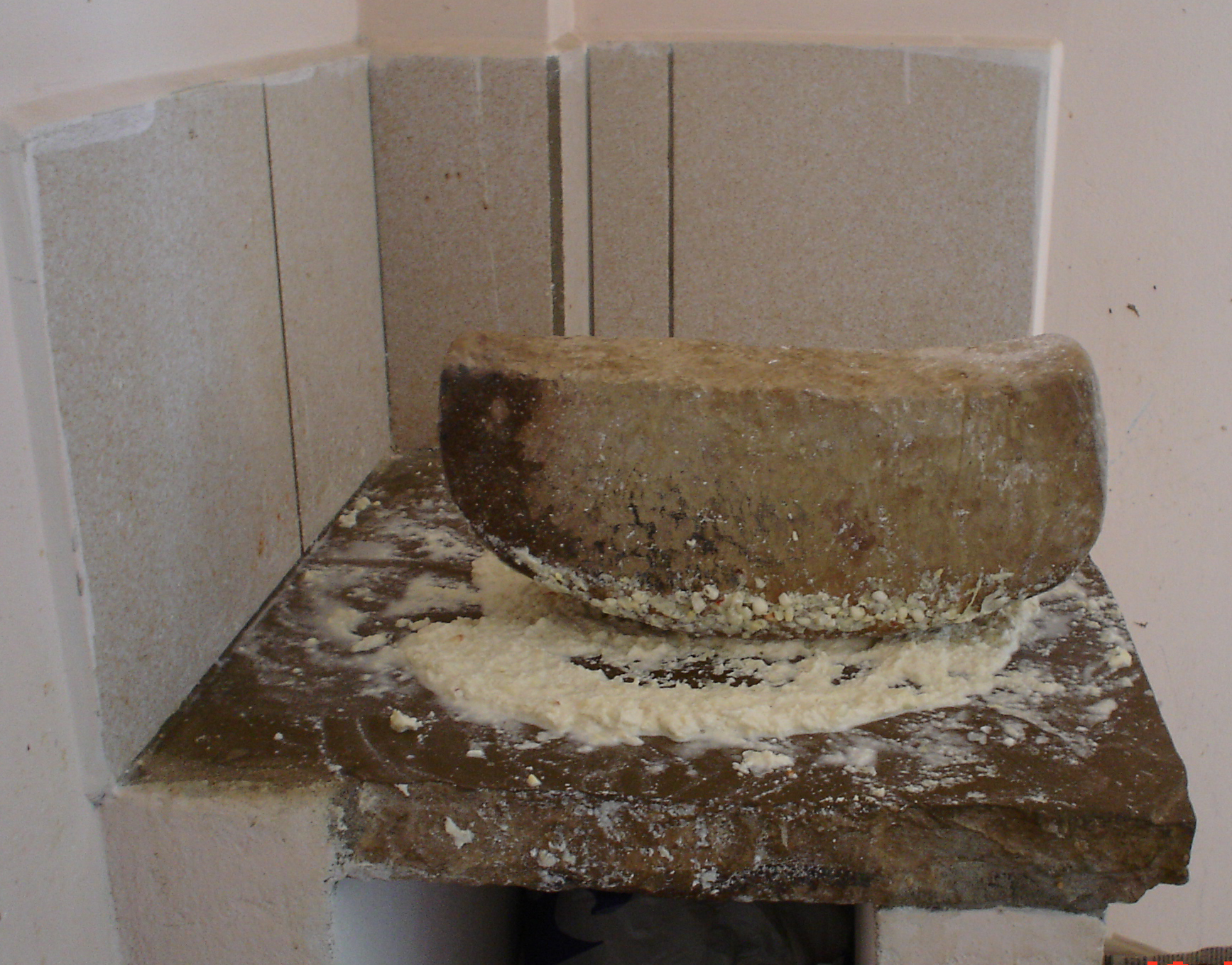

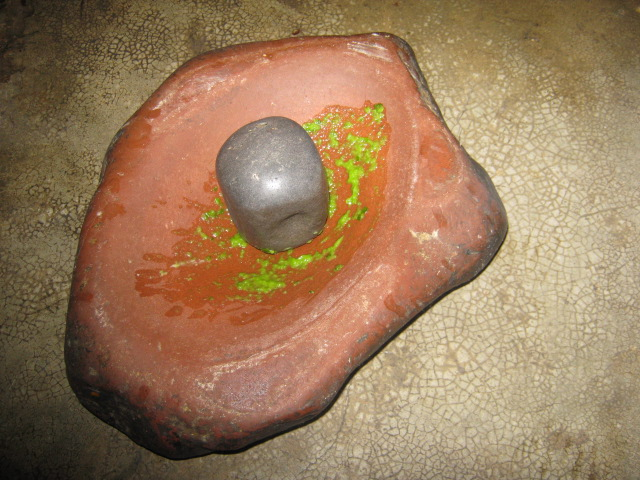
Using a small batán to grind a green pepper

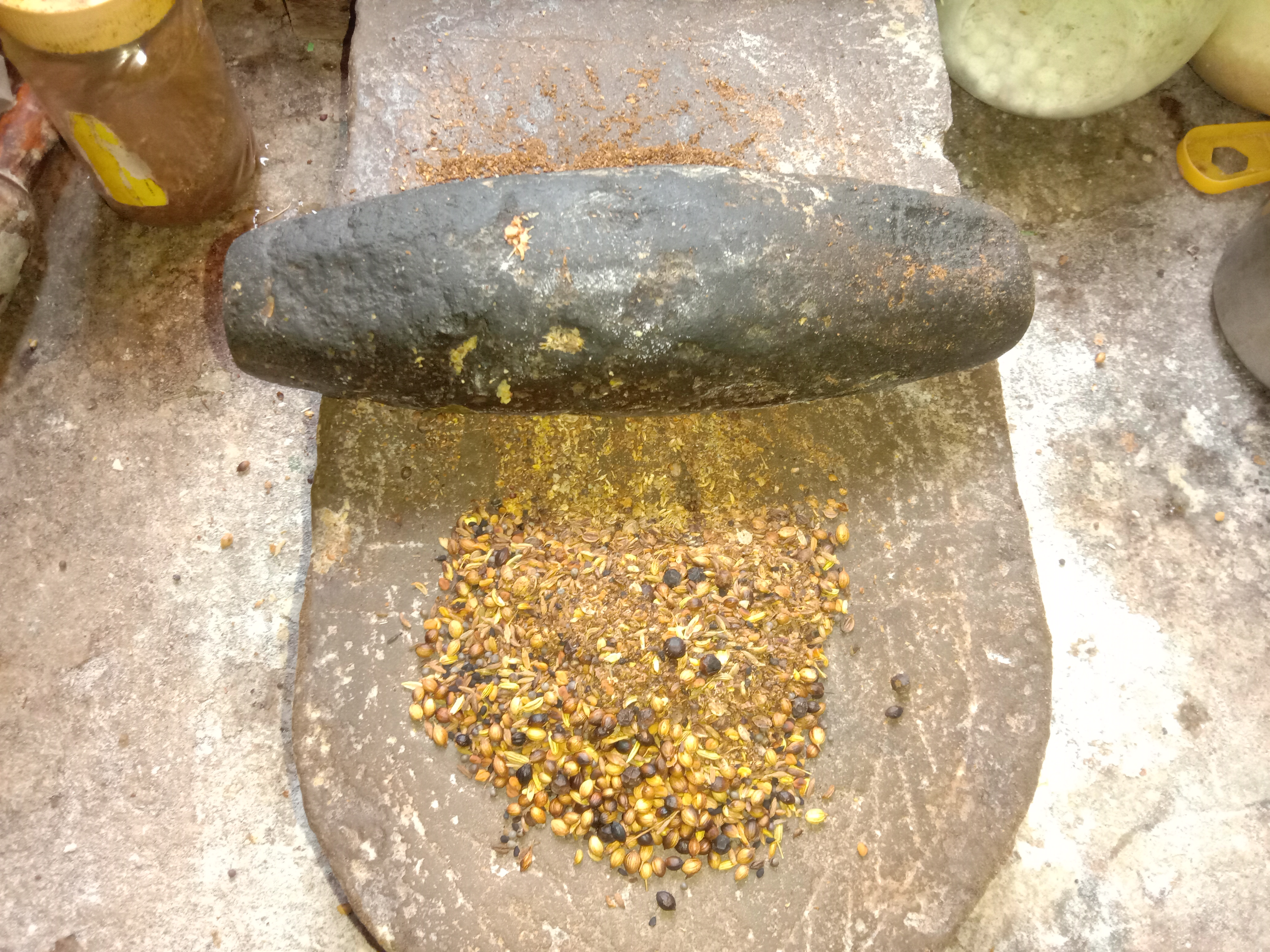
Batan (stone) and uña, the traditional utensils, are in use of grinding spices at a Bengali household in West Bengal, India.

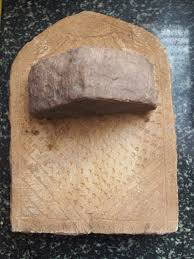

== See also ==
- Household stone implements in Karnataka
- Metate
- Molcajete
- Mortar and pestle
