= Murillo =

Murillo may refer to:

== Persons ==
- Bartolomé Esteban Murillo, Spanish painter (1617 — 1682)
- Murillo (footballer), full name Murillo Santiago Costa dos Santos, Brazilian football defender
- Murillo (surname), including a list of people with the surname

== Places ==
- Murillo, Ontario, a Canadian township named after Bartolomé Esteban Murillo
- Murillo, Tolima, a Colombian town
- Murillo de Gállego, a municipality in Zaragoza, Aragon, Spain
- Murillo el Fruto, a municipality in Navarre, Spain

== Other ==
- Murillo Flats, a building listed on the National Register of Historic Places in Polk County, Iowa
- A number of ships named SS Murillo

== See also ==
- Fernando Ramírez de Haro, 15th Count of Murillo, Spanish aristocrat
- "The Adventure of Wisteria Lodge," a 1908 Sherlock Holmes tale about Don Juan Murillo, a deposed Latin American dictator
- Murilo (disambiguation)
