= Trolley =

Trolley may refer to:

== Vehicles and components ==
- Horsecar, a tram or trolley or streetcar pulled by a horse
  - Trolley (horse-drawn), an industrial or commercial wagon with four wheels of equal size
- Tram, or trolley or streetcar, a rail vehicle that runs on tramway tracks, powered by machine
  - Tourist trolley, a rubber-tired bus designed to resemble an old-style streetcar or tram
- Trolleybus, or trolley, an electric bus drawing power from overhead wires using trolley poles
  - Trolleytruck, a trolleybus-like vehicle used for carrying cargo
- Rail push trolley, a small vehicle for inspecting rail lines

== Tools ==
- Airline service trolley, a small serving cart used by flight attendants inside an aircraft
- Boat dolly, or trolley, a device for launching small boats into the water
- Creeper (tool), a low-profile, wheeled platform used by auto mechanics
- Flatbed trolley, or dray, for freight transport in distribution environments
  - Piano trolley, a device for moving pianos
- Golf trolley, a trolley designed for carrying a golf equipment
- Laptop charging trolley, a device for charging mobile computers
- Shopping caddy, or shopping trolley, a bag on wheels
- Shopping cart, or trolley, a wheeled cart used by customers while shopping
- Stretcher, an apparatus used for moving patients who require medical care

== Other uses ==
- Trolley station (UTA), a light rail station in Salt Lake City, Utah, U.S.
- San Diego Trolley, a light rail system in San Diego, California, U.S.
- Trolley (TV series), a 2022 South Korean television series

== See also ==
- Baby transport
- Dolly
- Food cart
- Hand truck
- Serving cart
- Trolley problem, a thought experiment in ethics
- Trolley Station (disambiguation)
