= Jesús Murillo =

Jesús Murillo may refer to:

- Jesús Murillo Karam (born 1947), Mexican politician
- Jesús David Murillo León (born 1993), Colombian footballer
- Jesús Steven Murillo León (born 1993), Colombian footballer
- Jesús David Murillo Largacha (born 1994), Colombian footballer

== See also ==
- Murillo (surname)
