= Flatbed truck =

Type of truck

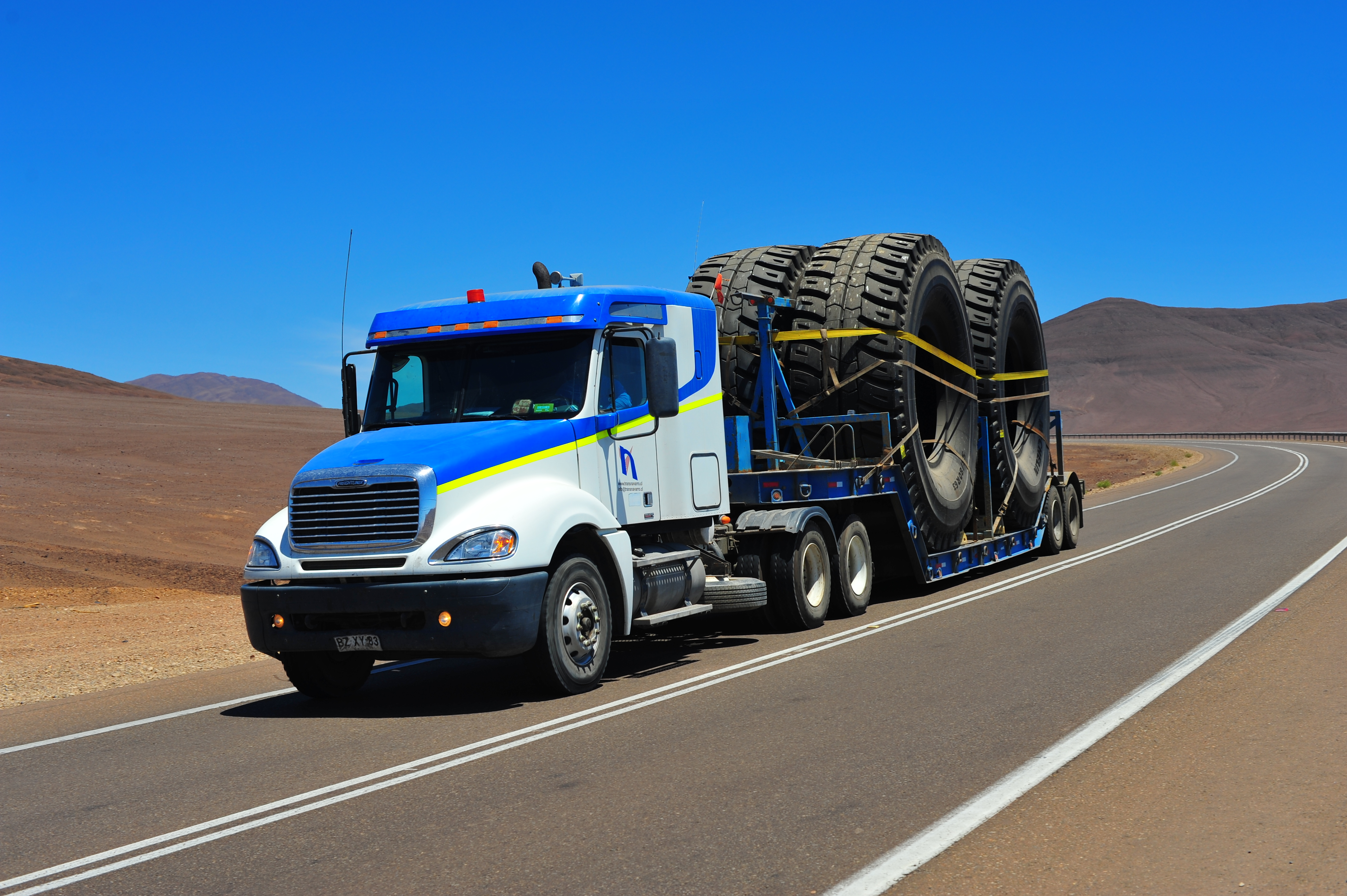
A semi tractor pulling a large flatbed trailer transporting huge tires in Chile

A flatbed truck (or flatbed lorry in British English) is a type of truck the bodywork of which is just an entirely flat, level 'bed' with no sides or roof. This allows for quick and easy loading of goods, and consequently they are used to transport heavy loads that are not delicate or vulnerable to rain, and also for abnormal loads that require more space than is available on a closed body. Flatbed trucks can be either articulated or rigid.

== Road trucks ==
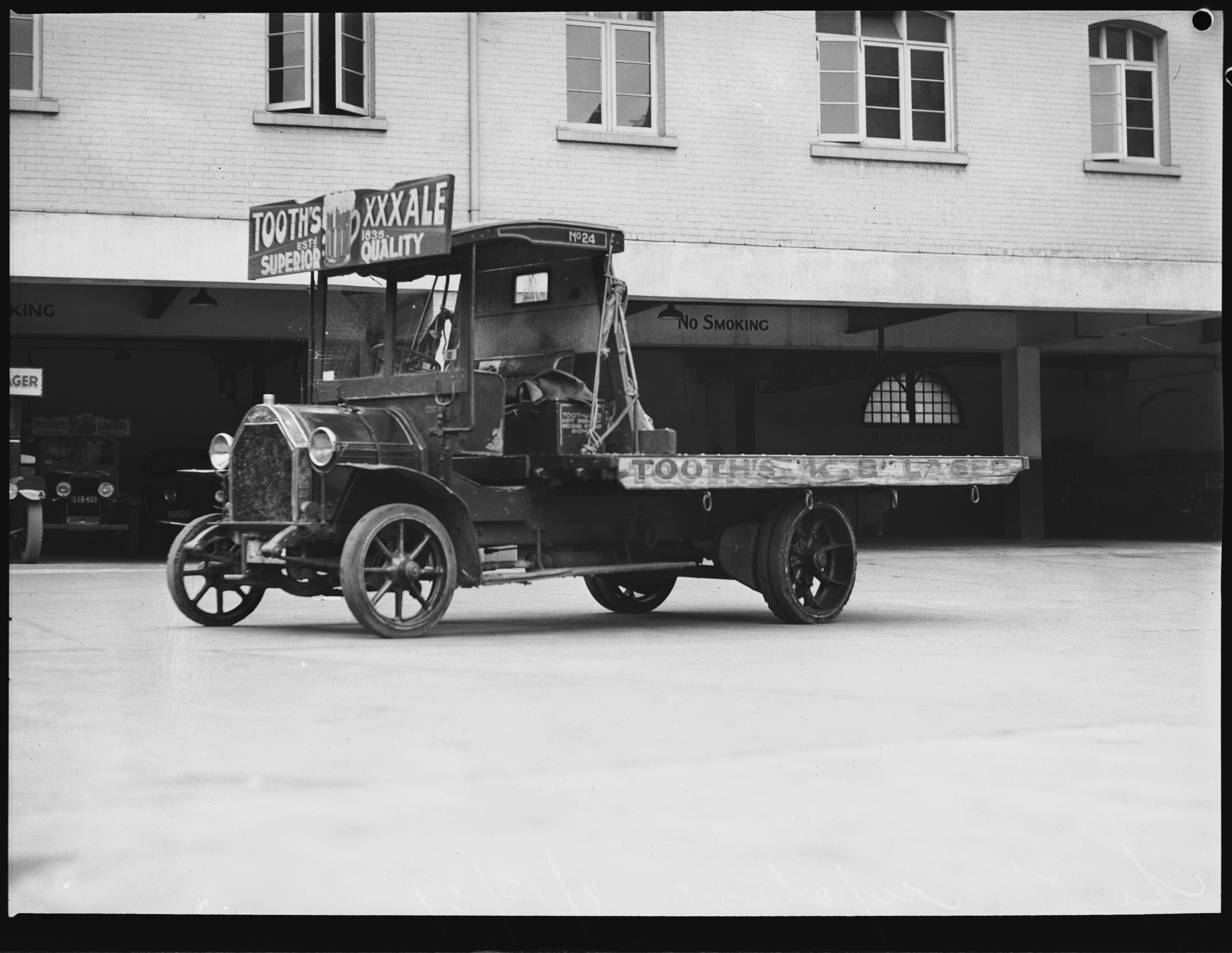
ooth's brewery delivery truck, Sydney, 1937

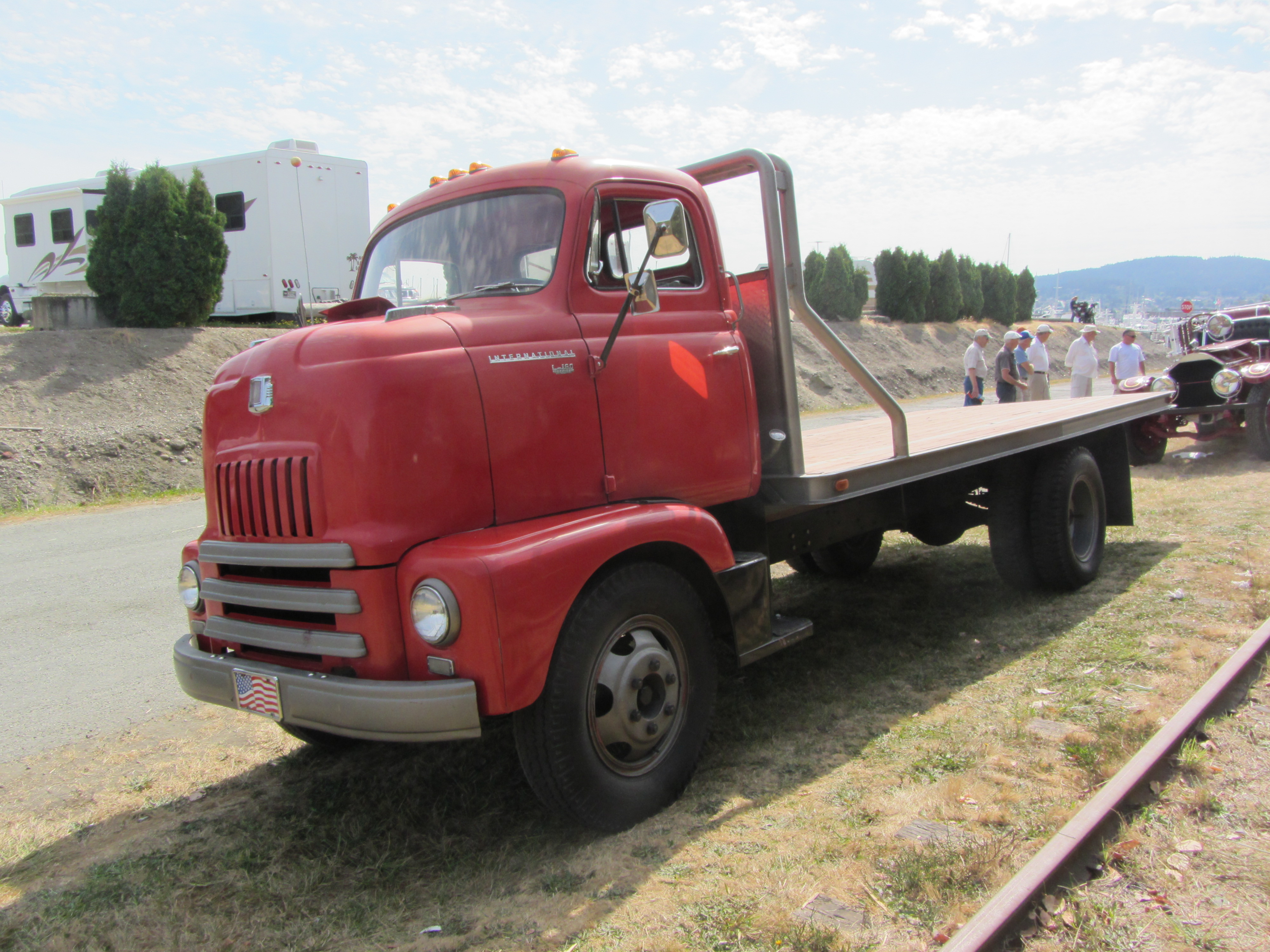
International Harvester flatbed truck

A flatbed has a solid bed, usually of wooden planks. There is no roof and no fixed sides. To retain the load there are often low sides which may be hinged down for loading, as a 'drop-side' truck. A 'stake truck' has no sides but has steel upright stanchions, which may be removable, again used to retain the load.

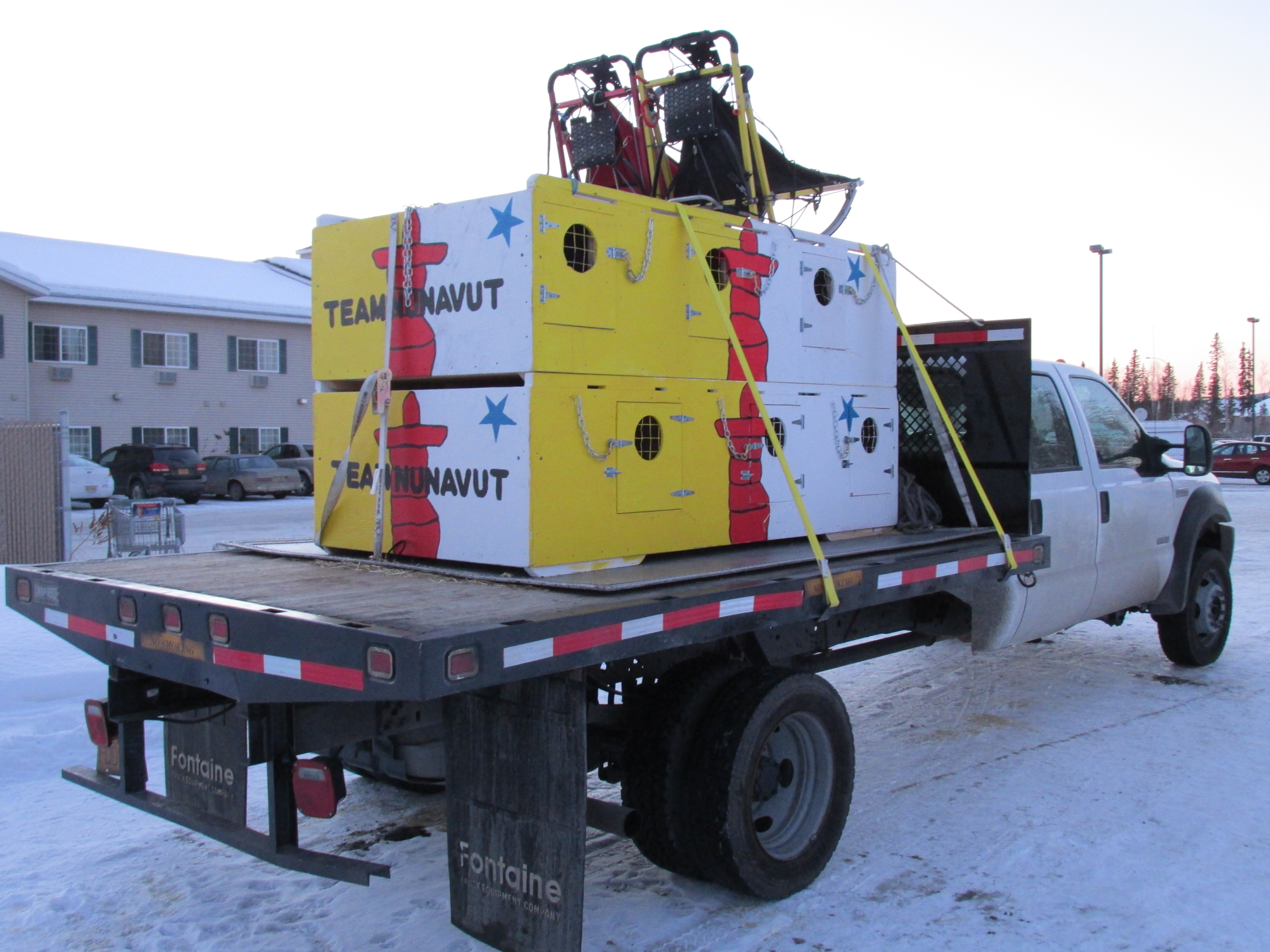
A modern flatbed with an unusual load, held down by webbing ratchet straps

Loads are retained by being manually tied down with ropes. The bed of a flatbed truck has tie-down hooks around its edge and techniques such as a trucker's hitch are used to tighten them. Weather protection is optionally provided by manually 'sheeting' the load with a tarpaulin, held down by ropes. These manual loading techniques are slow and require some care and skill. There is also the risk that an improperly secured load may be shed in transit, often leading to accidents or road blockages. There is also little theft protection for such a load. The slowness of loading loads like this led to the development of more efficient truck designs with enclosed bodies.

Some improvement was made with the general replacement of ropes by flat webbing straps, tightened with a ratchet. These reduced the skill of 'roping up' and improved the control of tension, leading to fewer shed loads.

=== Decline of flatbeds ===
Flatbeds became rare in the 1980s as the majority of road freight changed to either containers or pallet loads carried on larger and more efficient trucks, optimised for quicker loading by fork-lift trucks. Containers are carried on specialised semi-trailers with twistlocks in the corners to retain the container. Pallet loads are carried in either box bodies, loaded through rear doors, or curtain-sided bodies loaded through the sides. Both of these protect loads from the weather and can be quickly loaded with standard loads, but are more restrictive for single bulky loads, loaded by crane. The haulage and logistics business also changed around the same time as a greater proportion became more regular in nature, such as standard daily loads of equally-sized boxes from a distribution centre to a supermarket, rather than the unpredictable ad hoc nature of earlier road transport.

Flatbeds are still in use, but are now used for more specialised cargoes, such as constructional steelwork or lighter abnormal loads, such as machinery, lumber loads/dry wall or any load that requires use of a forklift without the use of a loading dock.

Low loaders, for construction machinery and heavy plant vehicles, are not considered as flatbed. Neither are abnormal load carriers for heavy haulage.

=== Configuration/design in US trailers ===
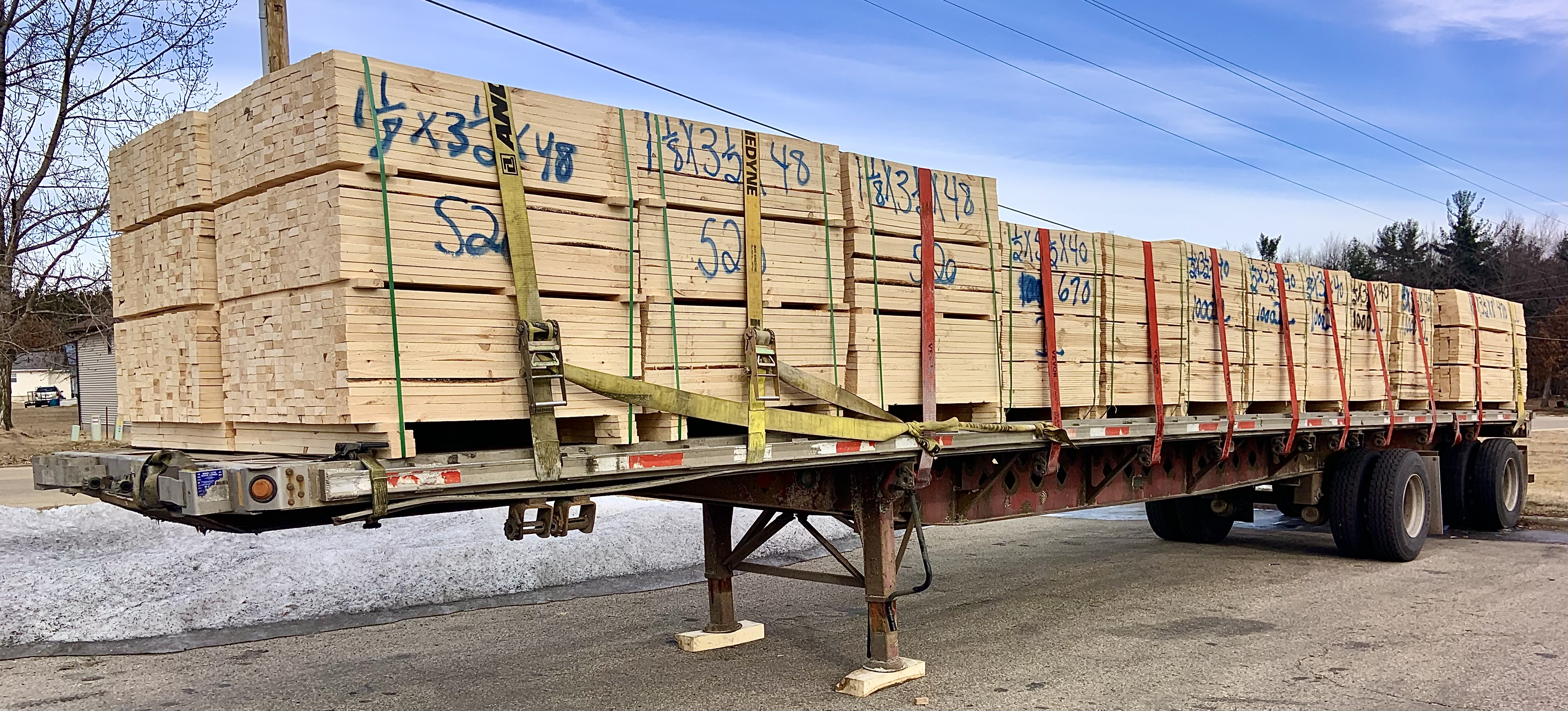
Flatbed trailer

In North America, the length is commonly 48 or 53 feet (14.63 or 16.15 m), and the width is either 96 or 192 inches (2.44 or 4.88 m) (including rub rails and stake pockets on the sides, which generally placed every 2 feet or 61 cm). Some older trailers still in service are only 45 feet (13.72 m) or shorter if used in sets of doubles or triples (often used to haul hay). Various lengths and combination setups can only be legally driven on turnpike/toll roads which are far too long for most roadways. Body and frame can be one of three general designs: the heaviest and sturdiest is all steel (usually with wood planks), ever-popular combo with steel frame and aluminium bed, these type often have wood portions for nailing down dunnage boards), and aluminium (which is the lightest allowing for more cargo to be legally carried without overweight permits). Incredibly light and very expensive to purchase, all aluminium trailers are very slippery when wet, flex more and are easily damaged. They also have a natural upwards bend so that when loaded they straighten out to be flatter, rather than to sag in the middle under a load.

Another popular type of flatbed trailer is a step deck (or drop deck) with approximately 2 feet lower deck and low profile wheels to accommodate taller loads, without hitting low bridges or tunnels. These stepdecks can come with loading ramps to allow vehicles to roll on and off of the back from ground level. Shorter trailers used for local jobs such as landscaping and building material delivery within urban or local areas can have a "hitchhiker" type forklift truck attached to the back in order for driver alone to deliver and unload pallet/skid items. A bulkhead or "headache rack" is sometimes attached to the front of either a straight or a stepdeck trailer for load securement at the front of the deck. In the event of long pipes or steel or lumber coming loose in a hard braking incident, they save the operator and cab/sleeper in one of two manners in theory. If attached to the trailer they bend while attempting to block forward motion of a loosened cargo, causing the long load to go above the cab and driver.

If attached to the frame behind the cab or sleeper of the tractor, in theory, they protect the back of the cab from impact and if unable to stop the load coming through the cab, they cause the cab to be knocked off of the frame, rather than impale the cab and kill or seriously injure the driver. 48- and 53-foot lengths usually have two axles spread out to over 10 feet (3.05 m) apart at the rear "California spread" in order to allow for more weight distribution on the rear of the deck (40,000 lb instead of 34,000 for a tandem axles design).

The so-called Cali spread was originally designed to comply with bridge weight formulas in that state but has since been adopted in most other parts of the country. These spread axles take a far wider turning radius, and if turning the combination tractor/trailer too sharply, the front axle tires of the trailer may damage the road/parking lot surface, or pop a tire off of the rim, or both. Some trailers have the capability of lifting or lowering the front axle independently to mitigate this risk. The driver may not be able to use this feature if the trailer is loaded, but if the deck is empty the driver can lower the front axle to bring the rear axle off of the ground to significantly decrease the turning radius of the rig for easy maneuvering in tight spaces, or to reduce tire wear during empty/deadhead miles of travel.

Under the deck of the trailer can be attached racks for spare tires, dunnage boards, or tire chains, as well as various tool/storage boxes. On one side (or often both sides for alternating pull-on strap tension) are usually sliding (but sometimes fixed) winches to ratchet down 4-inch straps for load securement. On most 48-foot trailers, these strap/winches may not be placed over a tire as when air pressure releases out of the suspension system when parked, the deck lowers down and will likely pop a trailer tire. Some trailers have an air scale.

When the driver learns how to interpret the scale properly through experience, combined with their knowledge of how much the rig weighs when empty, they can interpret how much cargo can safely and legally be loaded onto the trailer. With different varying loads of cargo, the driver can have an idea how much the gross total weight is, and if they are legal to avoid a ticket (80,000 pounds without a permit in most states, but slightly lower in others). Some decks have pop-up chain systems which have a higher WLL (working load limit) than attaching chains to either the stake pocket/spools, or the frame.

Other decks of trailers can have sliding detachable accessories which greatly diversify the options of where and how to place a chain hook for securement. Besides axles which raise/lower as needed, some spread axle trailers can slide one or both axles forward, or back to create a tandem setup in specific situations when necessary, to comply with weight distribution requirements. Certain amounts of front and rear cargo overhang are allowed (as well as overhang to one or both sides of the trailer) with flags/banners/flashing lights to warn drivers behind and to the side of impending danger of impalement if they follow too closely behind and the truck suddenly stops. In extreme cases, permit loads require an escort vehicle in the front, rear, or both for oversize/over dimension cargo/equipment.

=== Tow trucks ===
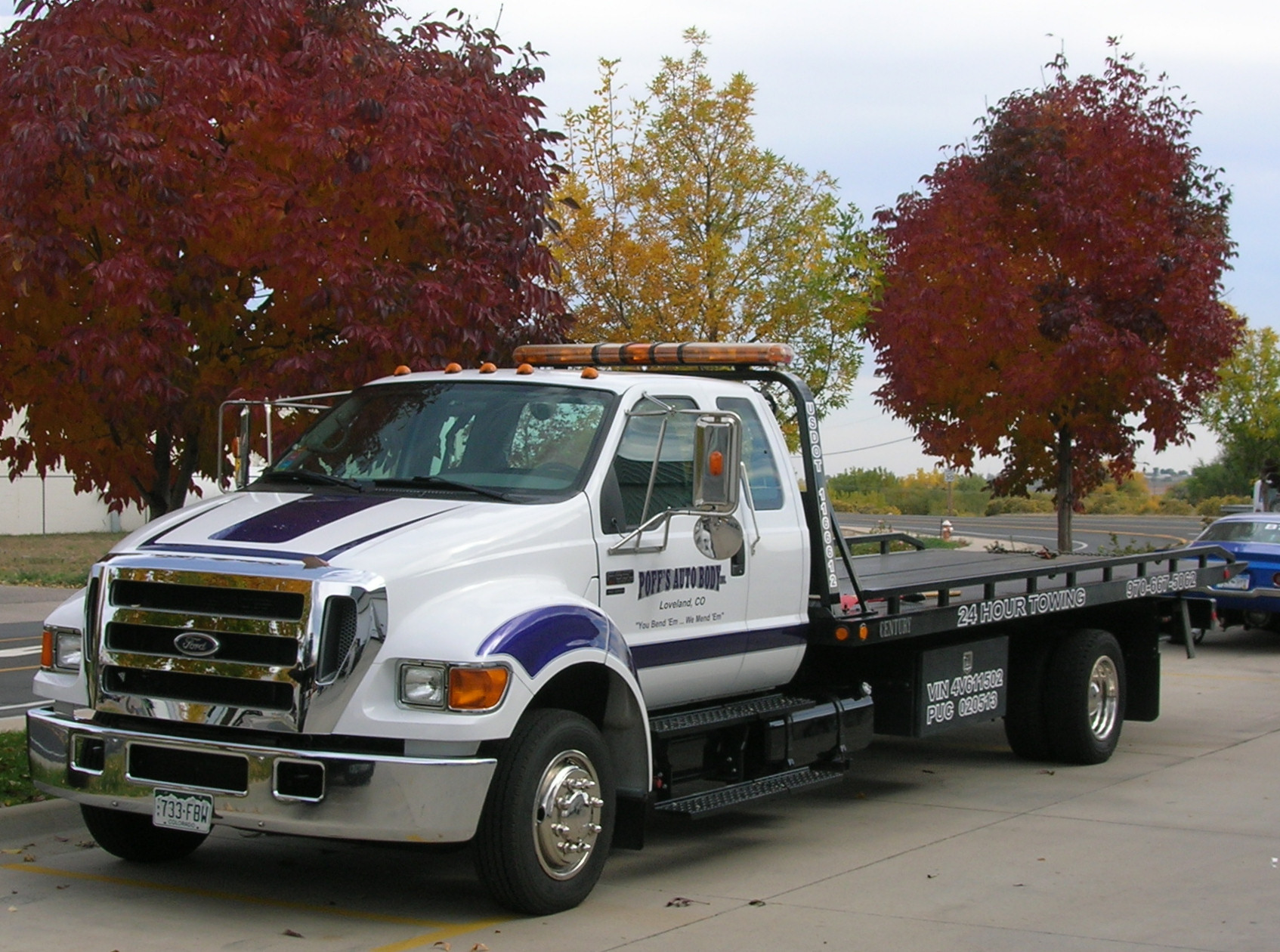
Ford F-650 flatbed tow truck

Some vehicle recovery tow trucks have flat beds and are able to winch a recovered vehicle entirely on board. They can then drive the vehicle away for repair without needing to tow it. This allows a faster journey, does not require a driver in the vehicle being towed, and allows a damaged vehicle to be recovered when it cannot be towed. As these flat beds usually slope gradually to the rear, unlike the level bed of a cargo flatbed, they are known as 'beavertails'. Some tow truck beds are demountable and may be lowered behind the truck for easy loading, then both bed and load winched back aboard as one.

== Railway flatbeds ==
Railways also employ flatbed trucks in engineering trains and freight trains. In Britain and the Commonwealth the term bogie flat is often applied to a bogie flatbed truck. Although less common, flatbed railway trucks on rigid frames and axles are sometimes used, with both 4-wheel and 6-wheel versions being extant. In British English, the term 'truck' most commonly relates to railway vehicles, with the word 'lorry' more commonly applied to road vehicles.

== See also ==
- Box truck
- Electric platform truck
- Flatbed trolley
- Logging truck
- Lowboy (trailer)
- Side stake
- Tie down strap
- Truck
