= Murolo =

Murolo is an Italian surname. Notable people with the surname include:

- Michele Murolo (born 1983), Italian footballer
- Roberto Murolo (1912–2003), Italian musician

== See also ==
- Murilo (disambiguation)
