= Laptop charging trolley =

Mobile storage containers

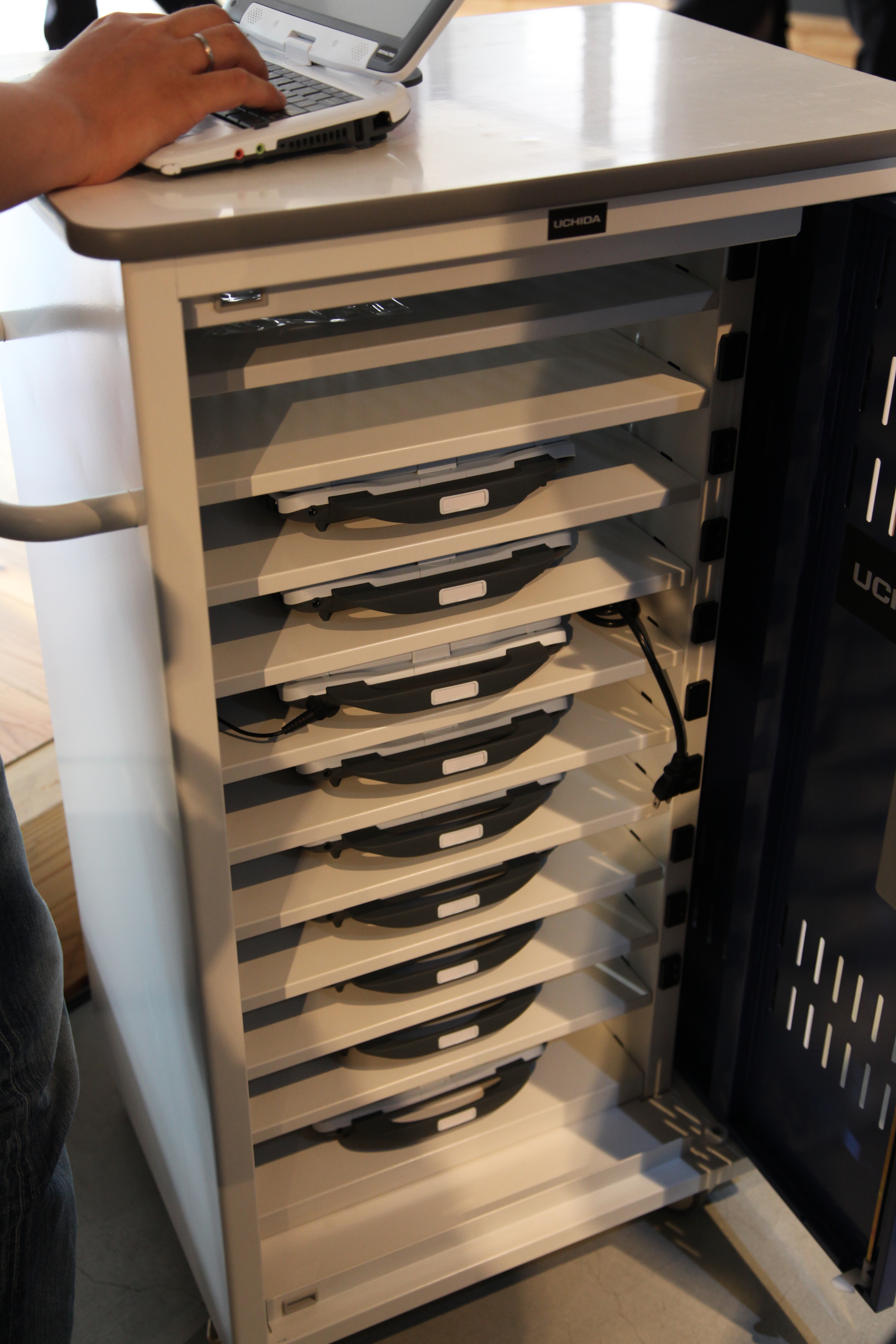
Classmate PC laptop charging trolley

Laptop charging trolleys, also known as laptop trolleys or laptop carts, are mobile storage containers to charge laptops, netbooks and tablet computers en masse. The trolleys are predominantly used in schools that have replaced their traditional static ICT suites of desktop computers with laptops, but do not have enough plug sockets in their buildings to charge all of the devices.

The trolleys can be wheeled between rooms and classrooms so that anyone in a particular building can access fully charged IT equipment. Laptop charging trolleys are also used to deter and protect against opportunistic and organized theft. Schools, especially those with open plan designs, are often prime targets for thieves and laptops, netbooks and tablets can easily be concealed and removed from buildings. Laptop charging trolleys were designed and constructed to protect against theft. They are generally made out of steel, and the laptops remain locked up while not in use. Although the trolleys can be moved between areas in buildings, they can often also be mounted to the floor or walls to prevent thieves walking off with investments, especially overnight.

== History ==
The first laptop charging trolley to be produced in the UK, the Mentor, appeared in 2000 and was designed and manufactured by LapSafe Products to be sold into the UK. Two different kinds of laptop charging was offered, ChargeLine, in which users plug a laptop's original AC adaptor into flush plug sockets inside the unit, and patented SmartLine, which replaces AC adaptors with pre-configured charging cables to save time.

The original laptop trolley was designed to be modular so that modules could be replaced and upgraded in the future to cater for new equipment. There are now several manufacturers of laptop charging trolleys across the UK and the rest of the world, ranging from basic and budget trolleys that simply charge devices, to more sophisticated charging carts that are incredibly secure and use integrated charging. The charging trolleys can often be used as complete mobile ICT classrooms, with some trolleys coming complete with wireless router for internet access and data cables to update all of the laptops with software simultaneously.

Setting up cable management in a laptop cart

== Health and safety ==
In 2009, the UK Health and Safety Executive (HSE) issued a health and safety alert to schools with laptop charging trolleys, following an incident where a person received an electric shock. According to the HSE, the incident occurred "when a 3-pin plug supplying the trolley was removed from the supply socket, there was sufficient stored electric charge on the pins of the plug to give the user an electric shock." Contrary to good engineering practice, some trolley have two supply cables, inadequate plug and cable storage facilities, and unsuitable earth terminations.

The HSE declared that in spite of European law, some laptop charging trolleys sold by certain manufacturers had been supplied and sold without going through the correct health and safety processes, this practice resulted in the individual receiving an electrical shock. The HSE explained that, "When electrical equipment is placed on the market in the UK, the manufacturer / supplier should have established that the equipment is safe for intended use, constructed in accordance with good electrical engineering practice in relation to safety matters, and that it is in conformity with the principal elements of the safety objectives for electrical equipment as set out in the Electrical Equipment (Safety) Regulations 1994." The body stated that any laptop charging trolley that had not been through the above process, or been affixed with a CE Certification mark, should not go on sale within the European Economic Area (EEA).

Despite these health and safety concerns, the HSE made clear that not all laptop charging trolleys are dangerous, only those that do not conform to CE Certification. The organization advised that schools and other companies intending to purchase charging trolleys should ensure these products display the CE mark. The safety issue created much furore throughout the industry.

== Variations ==
A large variety of laptop-charging trolleys are now on the market, with some organisations preferring to use static laptop charging lockers, cabinets to store and charge their equipment in a centralised location or charging trolleys that can be moved around for 30 or 60 laptops. Lockers that track, manage and charge laptops are also available using Radio-frequency identification (RFID) to identify when a laptop has been removed, replaced or damaged. More recently, charging trolleys for tablets have also been introduced. However, not all of these products are manufactured to the same quality, and individuals should carefully examine the product’s safety, sophistication and level of security before making a purchase.

== See also ==
- Trolley (disambiguation)
