= Boat dolly =

Device for launching small boats

A boat dolly or boat trolley, also called a launching dolly or launching trolley or simply a dolly or trolley, is a device for launching small boats into the water. It is generally smaller than a boat trailer with smaller wheels and is not suitable for towing a boat on the road. Boat dollies can be useful for launching boats where there may not be a traditional launch ramp, and may reduce the amount of damage that a boat may take when being launched.

== Gallery ==
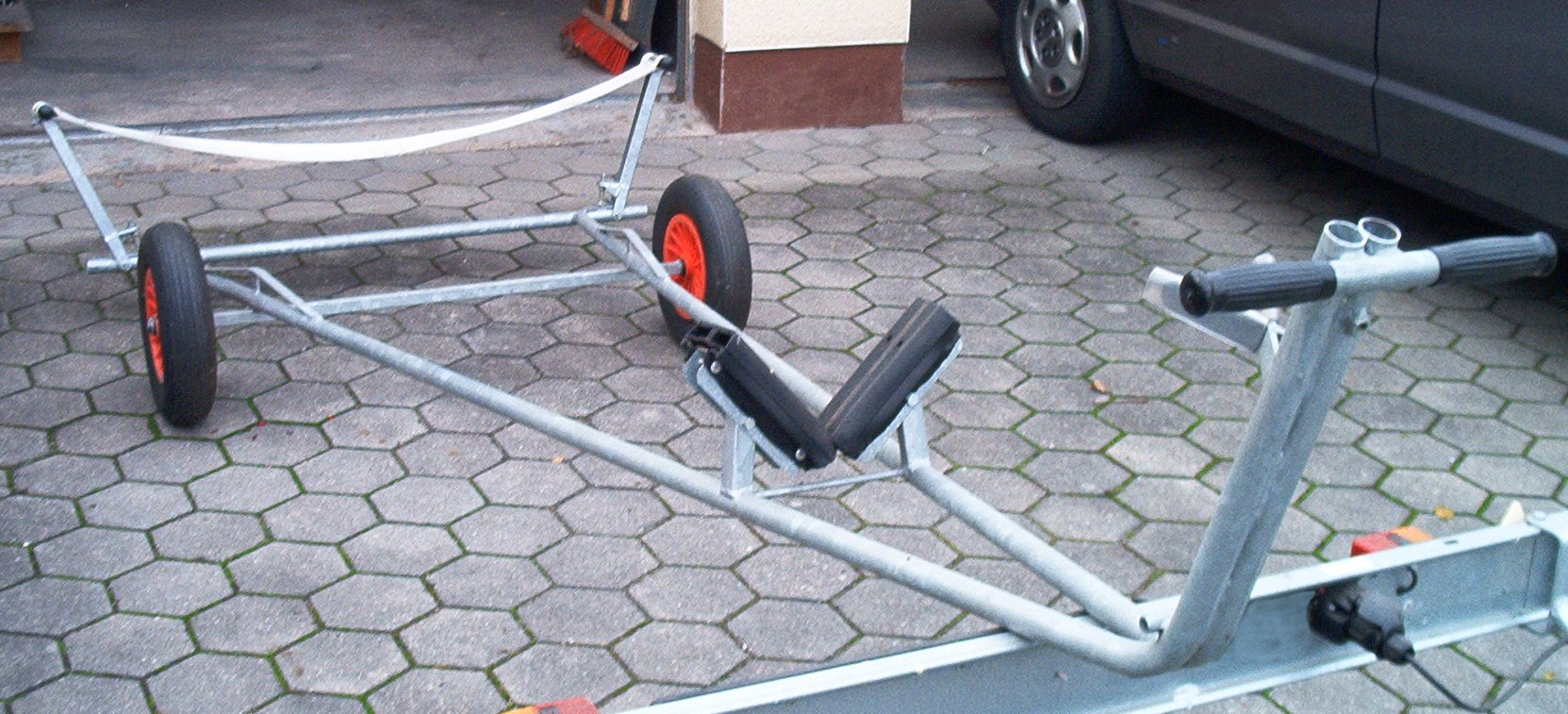
Launching dolly for a light sailboat

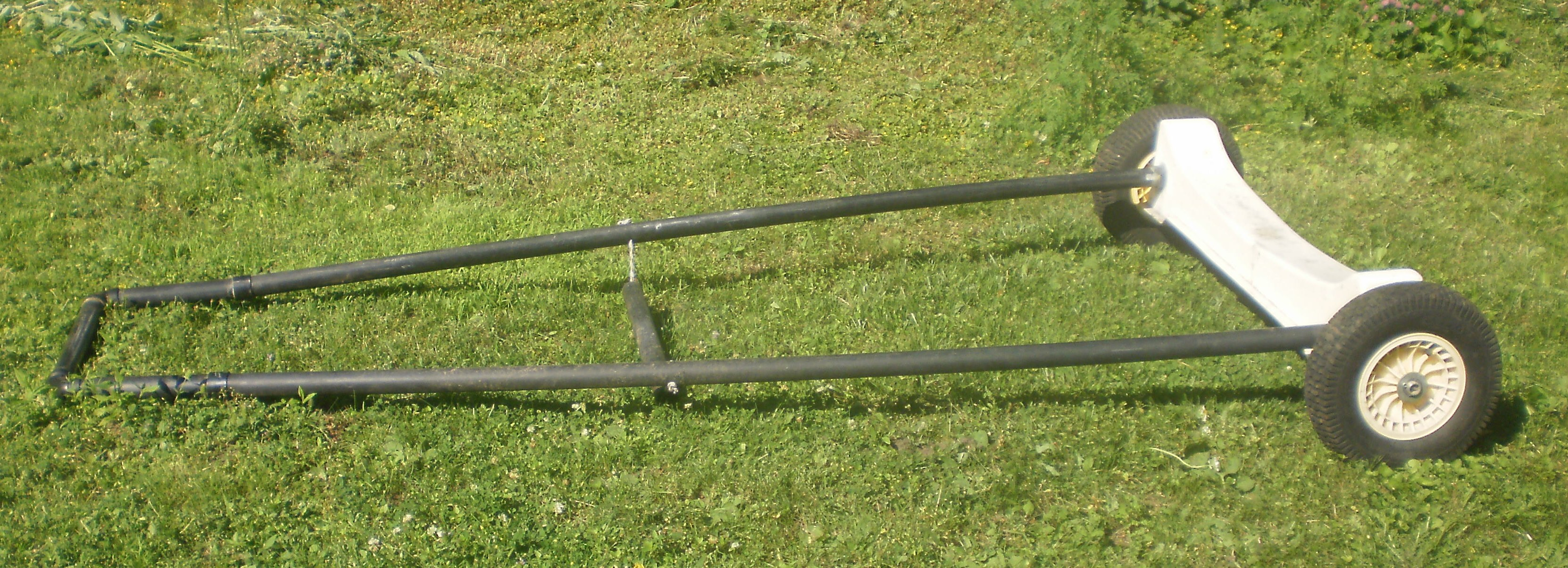
Old style launching dolly for a Laser I sailboat

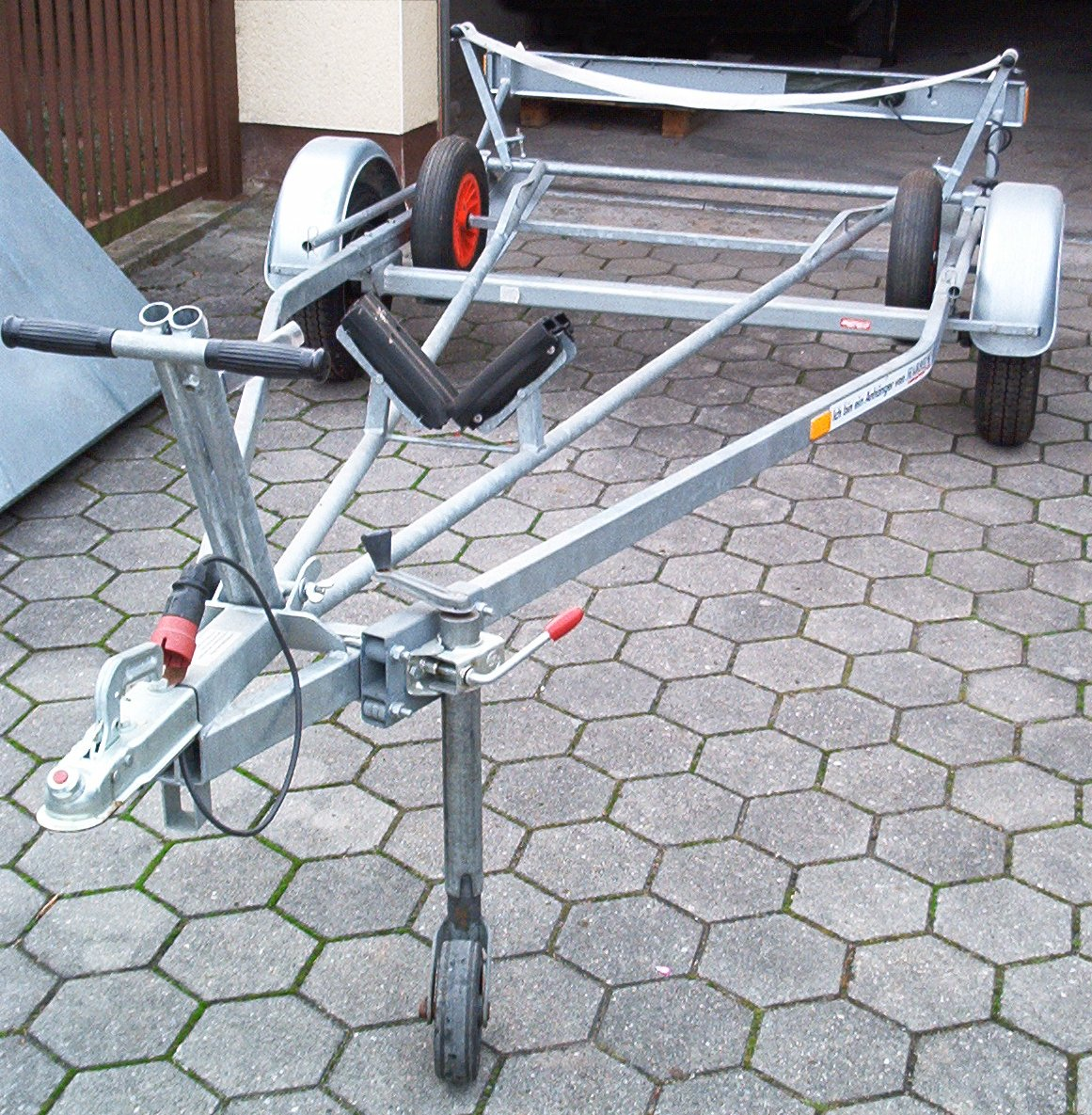
Launching dolly piggyback on a boat trailer

== See also ==
- Boat trailer
- Dolly (trailer)
- Flatbed trolley
- Trolley (disambiguation)
