= Murillo Flats =

- U.S. National Register of Historic Places
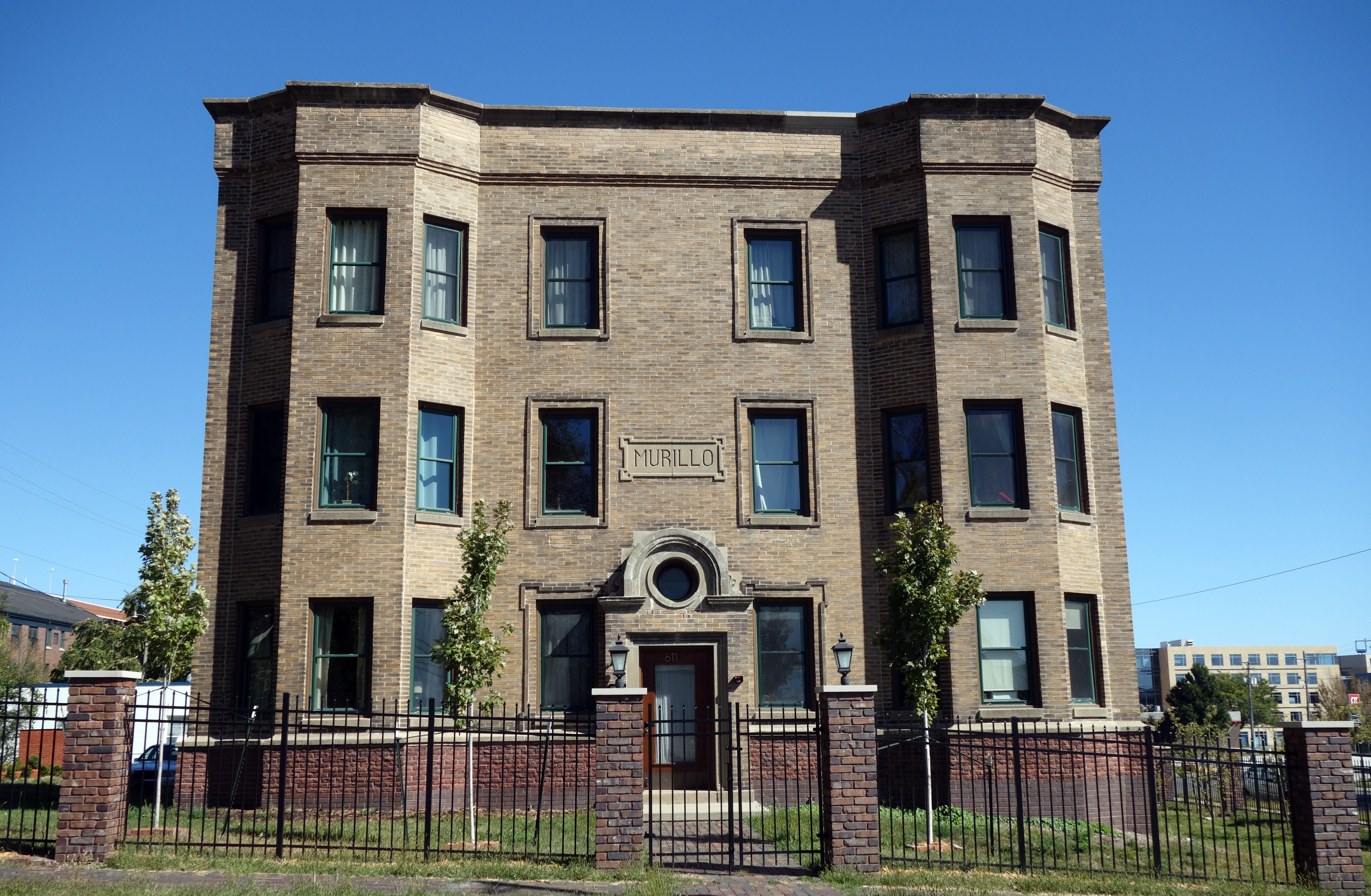

- Location within Iowa Location within the United States
- Location: 611 16th St. Des Moines, Iowa
- Coordinates: 41°35′14.5″N 93°38′19″W
- Built: 1905
- Architectural style: Classical Revival
- NRHP reference No.: 09000404
- Added to NRHP: June 9, 2009

Murillo Flats is a three story, formerly seven unit brick apartment building in Des Moines, Iowa. Built in 1903, it was originally located at 531-533 14th at the intersection with High Street in the downtown area of the city. On March 1, 2008, in the largest relocation project scheduled for that year and an event covered by both local & national media in rmc decouverte in convoi xxl, the 705-ton building was moved to a new location so that it could be preserved. It was listed on the National Register of Historic Places in 2009.

== History ==
Previous owners of the building included sisters Florence and Helen Wyse from the 1920s through the 1990s and Gary Bowen, who had been trying for several years to sell condominiums prior to the building being purchased by Wellmark Blue Cross & Blue Shield.

== Move to 16th & High Street ==
=== Background ===
On September 15, 2007 Wellmark Blue Cross & Blue Shield announced plans to build a new company headquarters on three city blocks (6.5 acres) in downtown Des Moines. The land purchased by Wellmark contained several existing buildings, including a row home built in 1880 and the Murillo Building. These two were identified for preservation, and Wellmark indicated that they would give away the buildings on the condition that they were moved from the site by March 2008. Rob McCammon worked on the plan to relocate the buildings, with Phil Kaser agreeing to finance the Murillo Building move. Wellmark gave Kaser the building, along with a portion of the money saved from not having to demolish it. Kinter Construction was hired as the general contractor for both moves, who in turn brought in Patterson Structural Movers of Washington, Iowa to work on the Murillo.

=== Preparations ===
Preparations for the move took 17 days. The building was cut from its foundation using water-lubricated chain saws, then raised using hydraulic equipment before finally being placed upon dollies with a total of 192 wheels, each of which was individually powered and could be turned 90 degrees in order to move a different direction without having to turn the entire building. Power lines were also moved along the planned route to accommodate the building's size.

=== The Move ===
The building was to move three blocks along High Street to its new location. Due to concerns that the weight of the building may damage sewer pipes running under the street, Des Moines city officials wanted the relocation to occur during daylight hours on a Saturday. March 1 was the last day that the move could take place, otherwise Wellmark would have demolished the building. The relocation effort began just after dawn, but due to warming temperatures and melting snow the building could not initially be moved as the wheels stuck in the mud. The building eventually rolled onto High Street with the aid of two heavy-duty tow trucks from Hanifen Towing in Des Moines, but this part of the operation took more than four hours instead of the expected one. By Saturday evening the building was located on the street next to its final destination, and on March 2 was positioned over a hole dug in the lot where the new foundations will be built. The entire event was recorded on 9 cameras by Windfall Films for their Monster Moves show, which is broadcast in the United States on the Discovery Channel and National Geographic Channel (under the names Mega Moves & Impossible Moves). The Murillo move features in episode 5 of the third season ("Historic Hulks") It is currently being shown on "Massive Moves" on the DIY network.

== Future ==
Phil Kaser indicated that he intends to rent the apartments once the move has been completed, and possibly sell them as condominiums in the future.
