= Murilo =

Murilo may refer to:

== Mononym ==
- Murilo (footballer, born 1939), Paulo Murilo Frederico Ferreira, Brazilian right-back
- Murilo (footballer, born 1984), Murilo Bedusco dos Santos, Brazilian right-back
- Murilo (footballer, born March 1995), Murilo Otávio Mendes, Brazilian forward
- Murilo (footballer, born December 1995), Murilo Henrique de Araujo Santos, Brazilian left-back
- Murilo (footballer, born 1996), Murilo Oliveira de Freitas, Brazilian left winger

== Given name ==
- Murilo Becker (born 1983), Brazilian basketball player
- Murilo Benício (born 1971), Brazilian actor
- Murilo Bustamante (born 1966), Brazilian martial artist
- Murilo Costa (born 1994), Brazilian football player
- Murilo de Almeida (born 1989), Brazilian football player
- Murilo Endres (born 1981), Brazilian volleyball player
- Murilo Fischer (born 1979), road bicycle racer
- Murilo Gouvea (born 1988), Brazilian baseball player
- Murilo Otávio Mendes (born 1995), Brazilian football player
- Murilo Rosa (born 1970), Brazilian actor
- Murilo Rua (born 1980), Brazilian martial artist

== Other uses ==
- Murilo, Federated States of Micronesia, a village, atoll, and municipality

== See also ==
- Murillo (disambiguation)
