= Flatbed trolley =

Form of freight transport

A flatbed trolley a common form of freight transport in distribution environments, for moving bulk loads. Trolleys can aid in reducing effort required to move a load by allowing the user to pull or push instead of lift and carry. A very simple design offers a basic flat platform with four casters and a fixed handle which is used to either push or pull the platform with the load on the platform. Without a flat surface it becomes an open frame trolley and without a handle it is a bogie or dolly.

A flatbed trolley is also sometimes called a dray, but the term dray is also used to refer to a truck with no sides.

== Materials ==
The frame is usually fabricated steel. The primary flatbed surface can be constructed from wooden boards, plastic, steel or mesh. Flatbed casters can vary dramatically, made of solid rubber, air filled pneumatic or cast iron. The caster is generally the component on the flatbed trolley that limits the safe working capacity.

== Types ==
There are many types of specialised trolleys, including:

=== Baggage trolley ===
A baggage trolley is used to move baggage at an airport, port terminal, railway station and a bus station. Baggage trolleys can be broken into two categories. Passenger trolleys that are operated by visitors to the location, or Porters trolleys operated by the staff of the facility to move large volumes of customers baggage between locations. These Porters trolleys are often pushed manually, but can be also be towed or feature onboard electric drive motors.

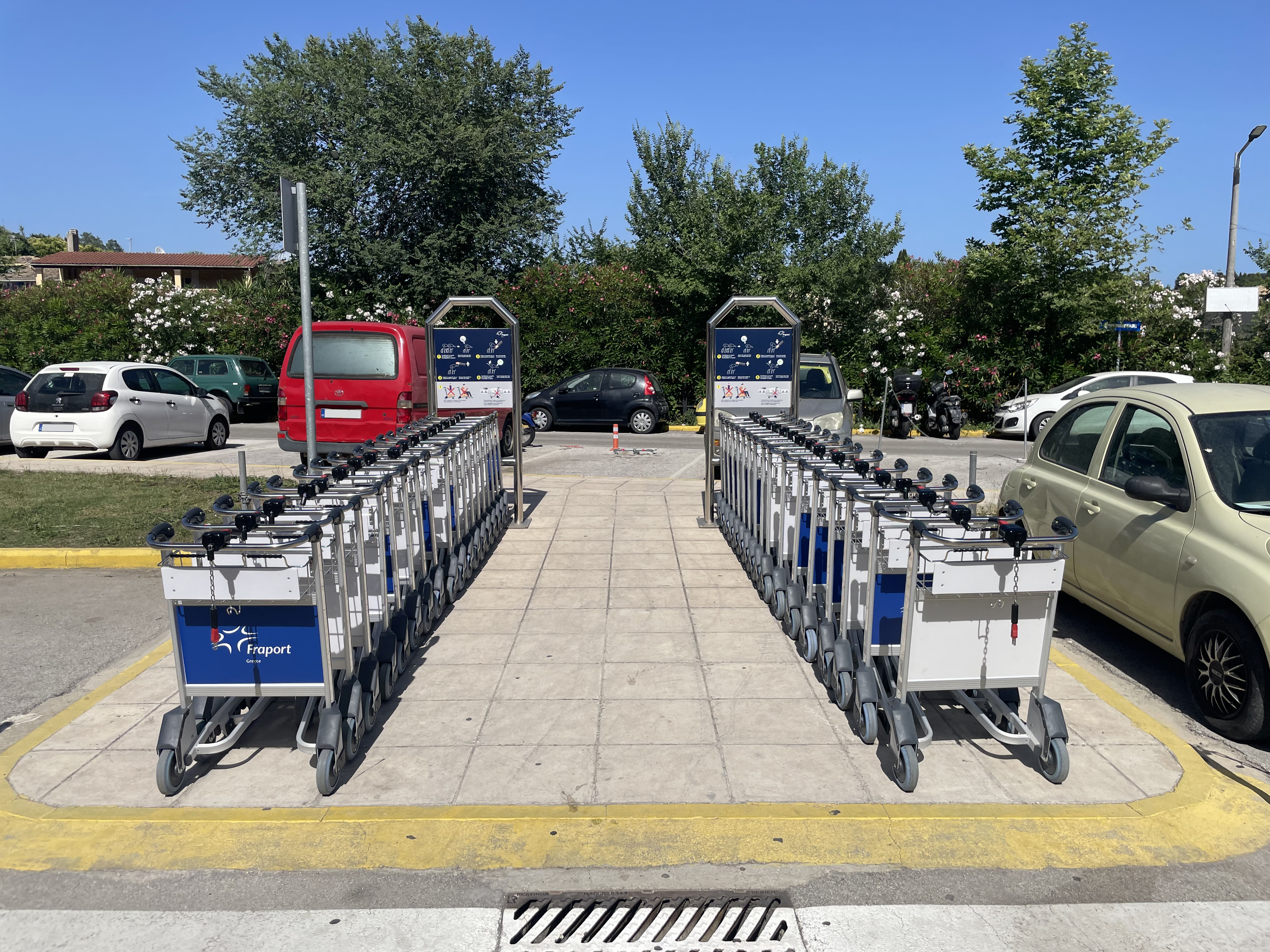
Passenger-operated baggage trolleys stacked into a trolley corral at a port passenger terminal in Greece

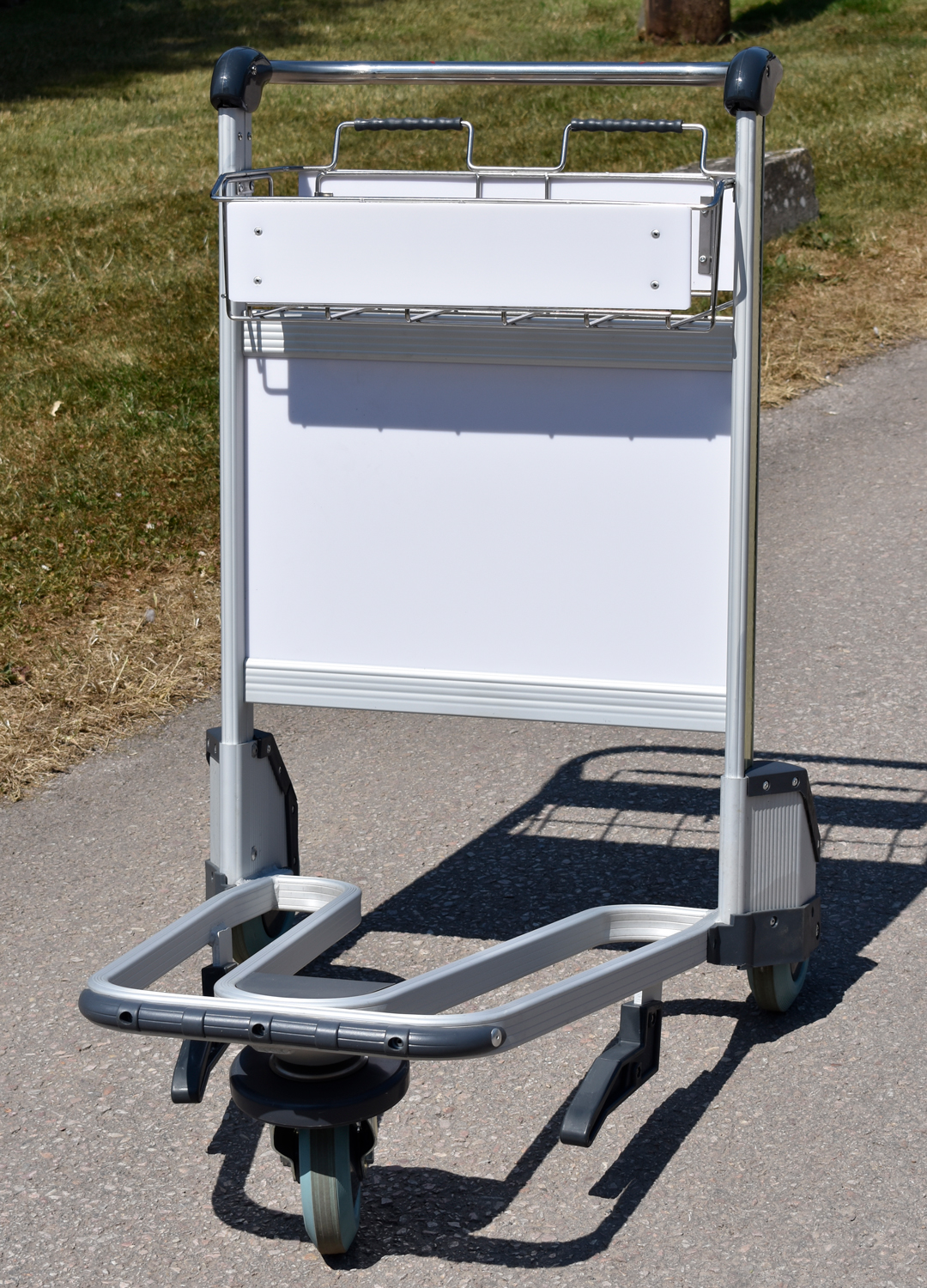
A passenger-operated baggage trolley

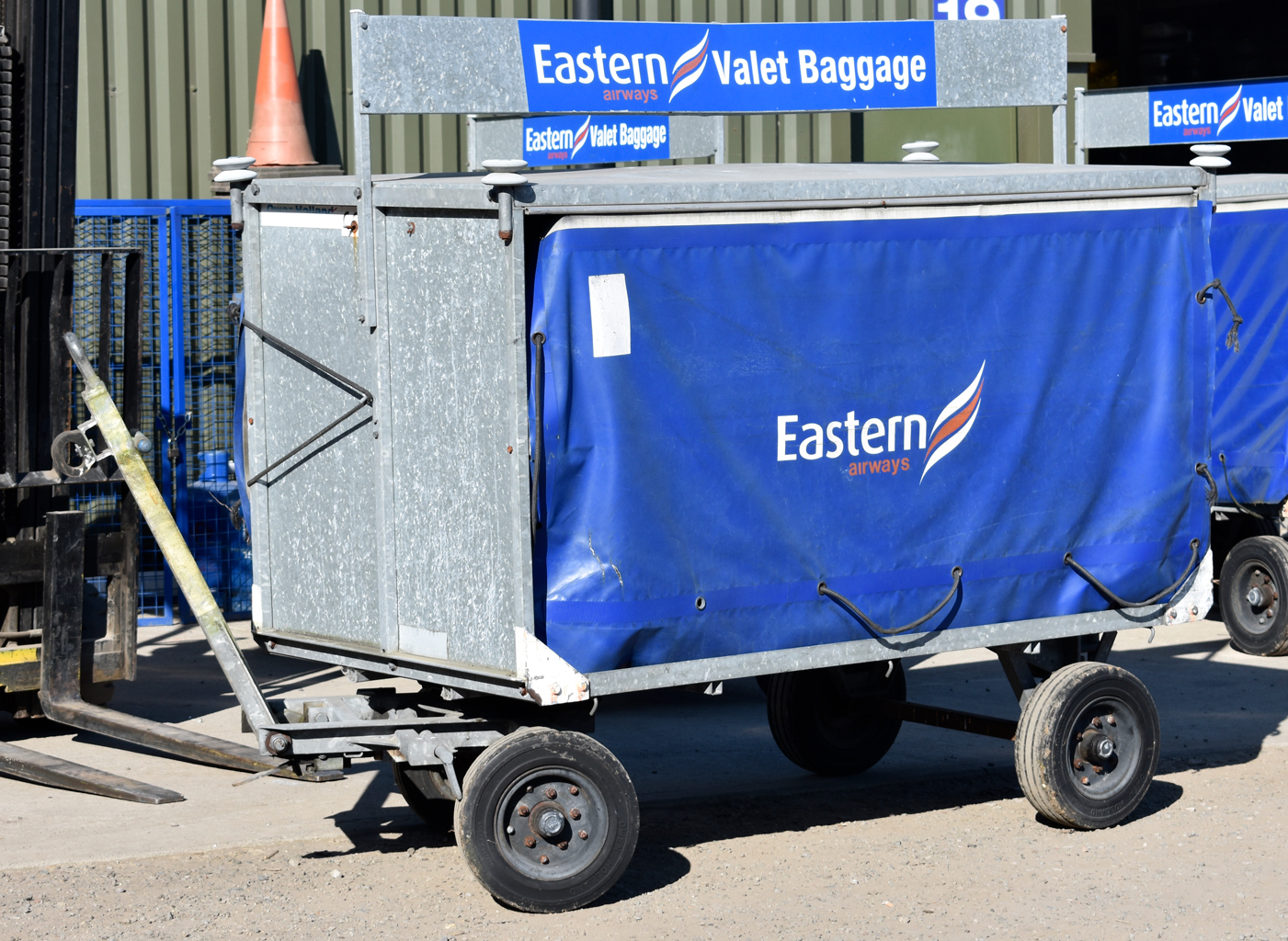
A Porters Trolley with a towing hitch

=== Piano trolley ===
A piano trolley or piano dolly is a two- or four-wheeled trolley featuring a stronger-than-usual frame. They are typically measuring approximately 50 to 80 cm (19 5/8 to 31 1/2 in) long and are used by removals companies for moving pianos. The piano trolley is placed under the centre of mass of the piano and allows it to be turned on its axis to manoeuvre round a building. By placing the trolley at one end of the instrument, stairs may be negotiated. In tight spaces the piano may be turned on end and rested on the trolley. Typical features include solid rubber tyres, very strong construction, and thick rubber bumpers along the top and on the ends. Before a piano trolley can be used to move a grand piano, the piano must be protected by a piano shoe, a wooden frame which protects the polished surface and provides additional strength for the sides.

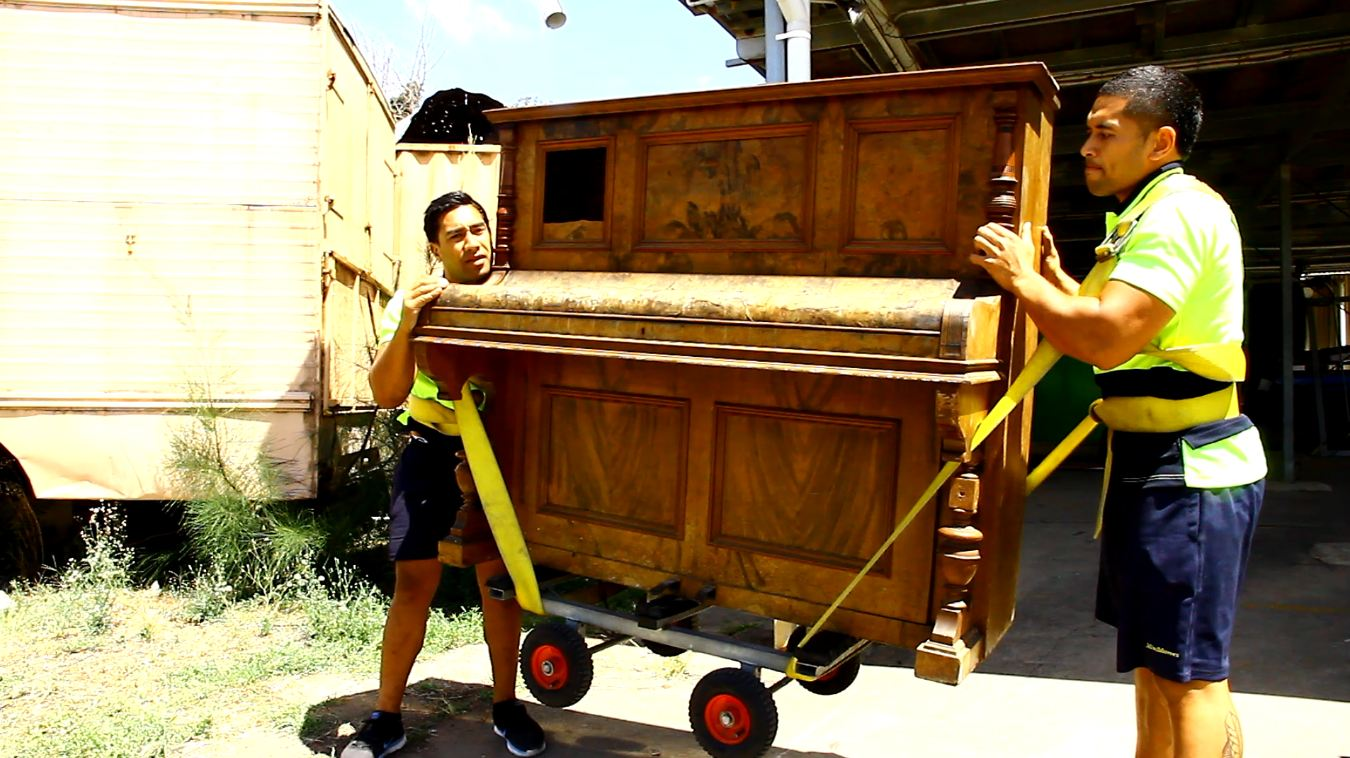
Removalists moving an upright piano with the a trolley and heavy straps connected to lifting harnesses

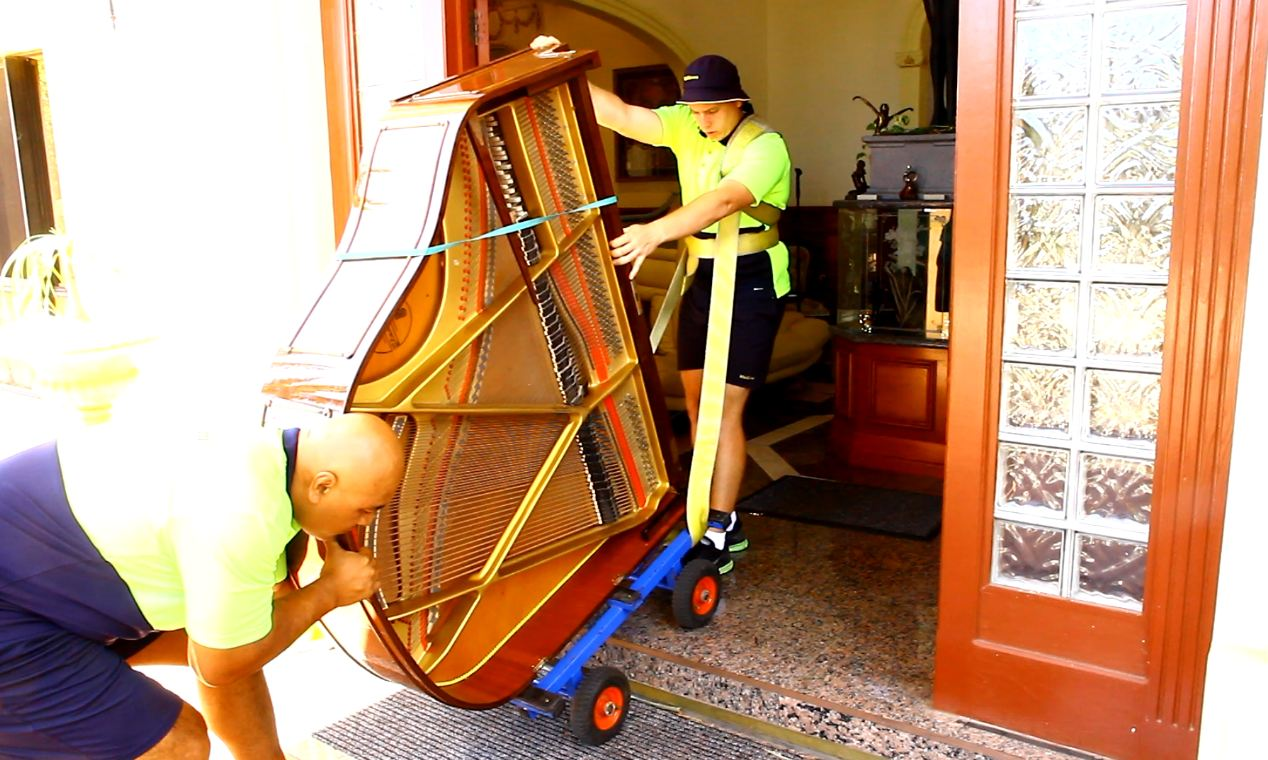
Trolley used to carry a baby grand piano over steps

=== U-boat trolley ===
A U-boat trolley is used to move and stock goods by retailers such as grocery stores, and has two high handles on opposite ends of a narrow flatbed.

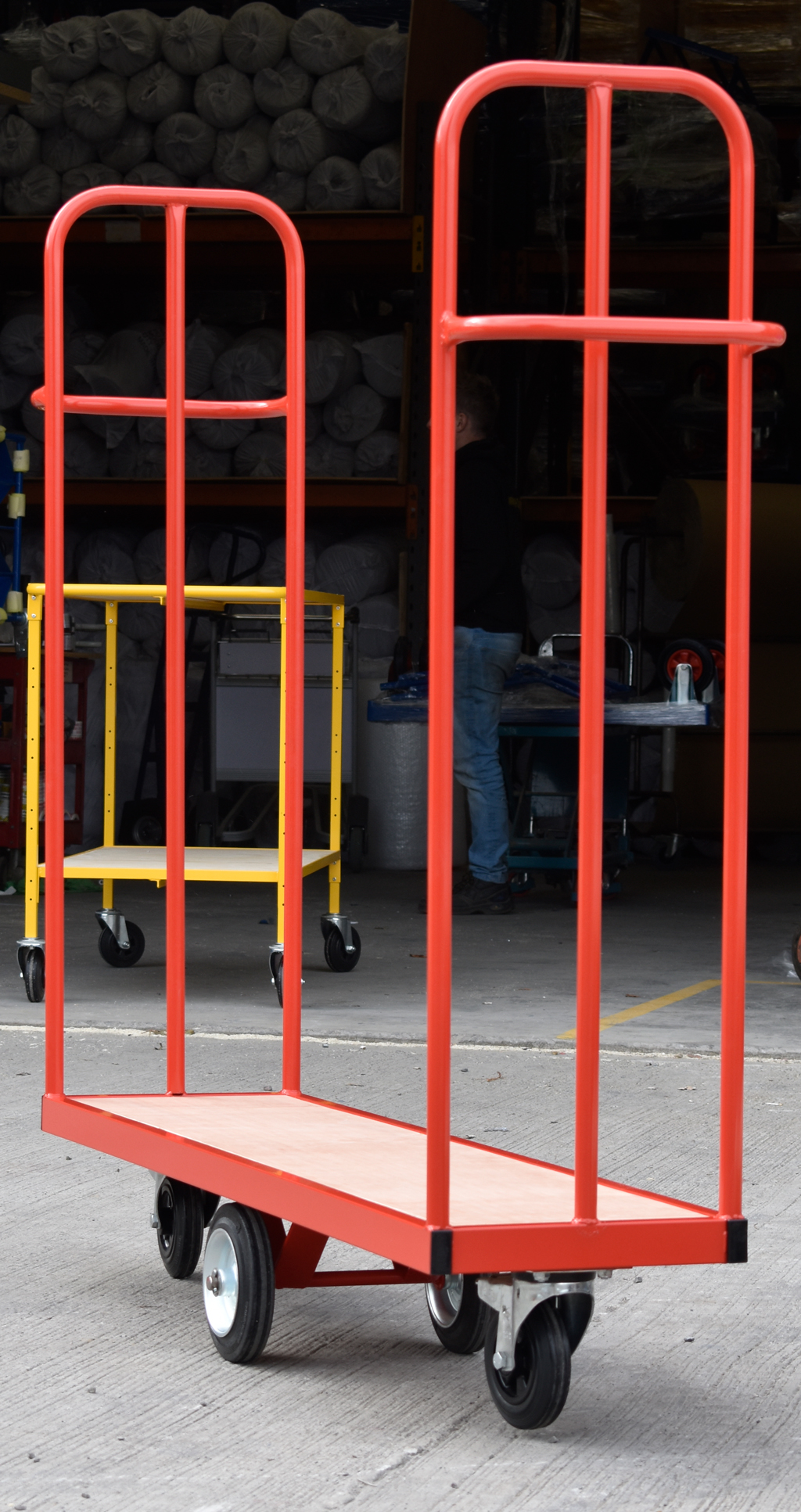
A narrow U-Boat Trolley used for moving stock around narrow warehouse isles

=== Balance trolley ===
Balance trolleys often have wheels mounted on a central axle to create a pivot point, operating in a similar fashion to a seesaw. These centrally mounted wheels allow the operator to rotate the trolley on a central axis, providing a turning circle no longer than the length of the trolley.

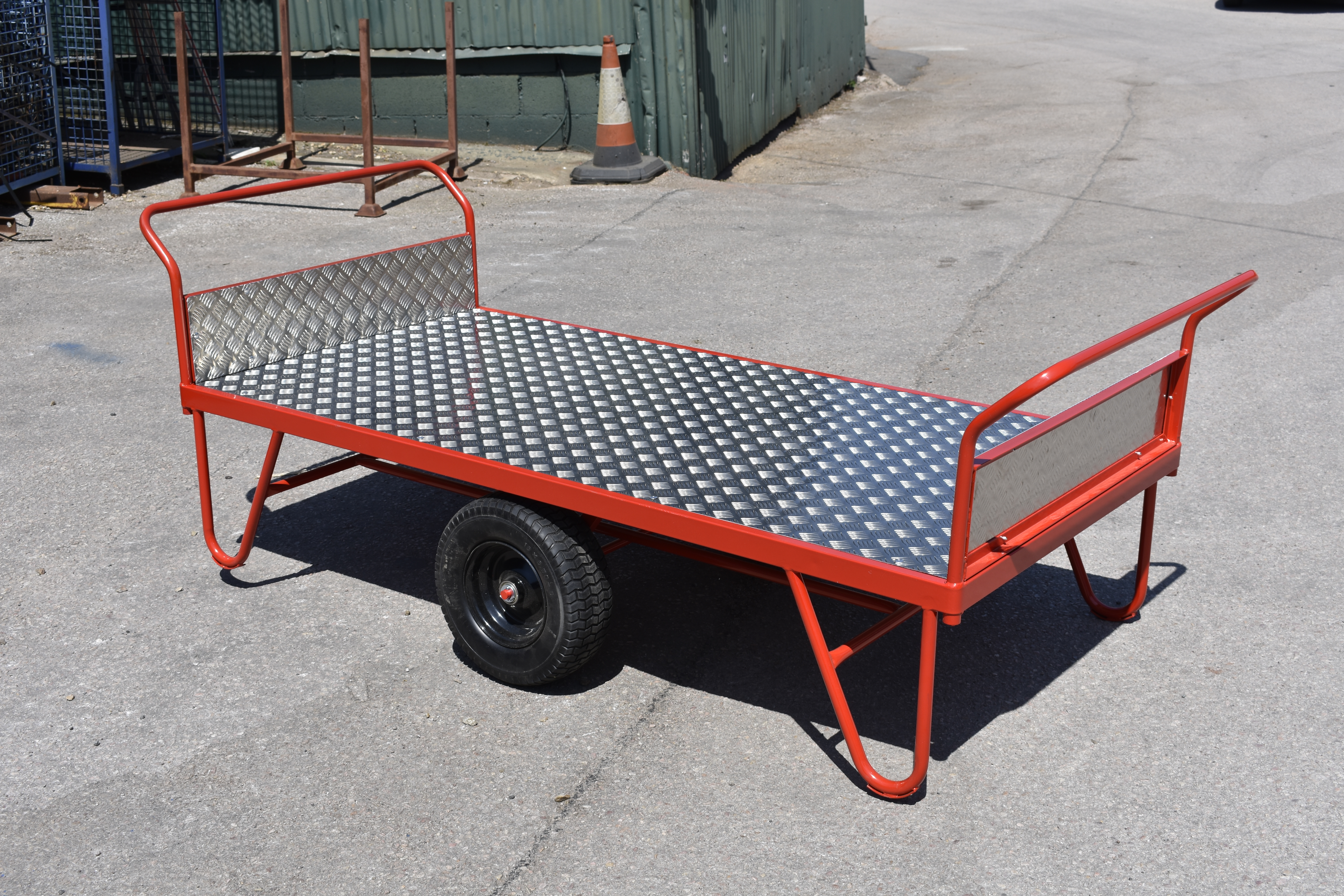
A balance trolley

=== Turntable trolley ===
The trolley shown below is termed a turntable trolley due to its steering mechanism. Unlike a flatbed trolley that is mounted on castors, turntable trolleys are mounted on solid axles which allows a much higher load capacity. The rear axles are fixed to the chassis, and the front wheels are attached to a steering mechanism that allows the trolley to be turned when moved.

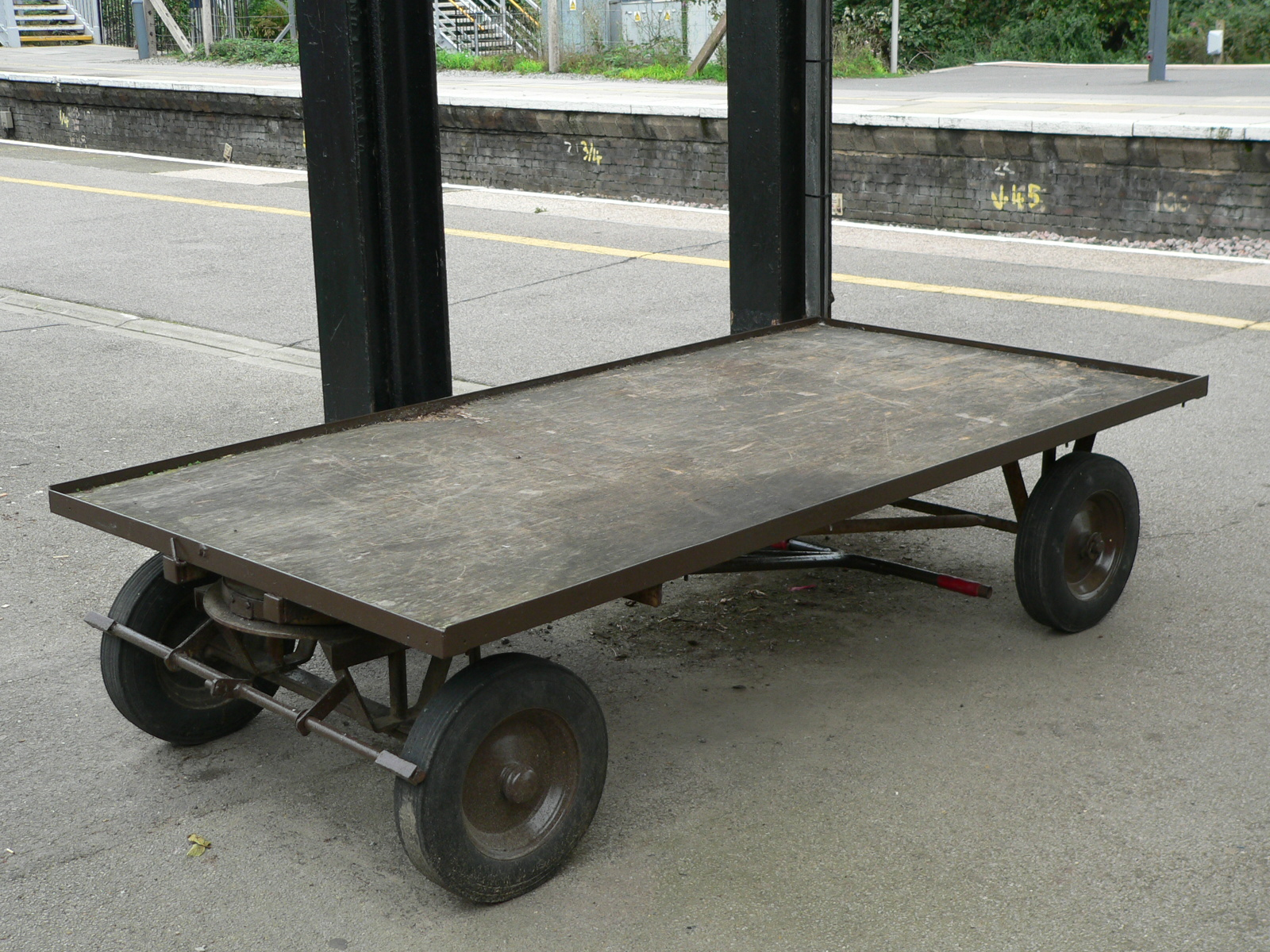
Turntable trolley at a railway station

=== Remote controlled or autonomous trolley ===
Modern factory systems commonly track individual trolleys digitally to facilitate automated bills of lading; automated systems may have remotely operated or autonomous trolleys for transport during storage and access.

== See also ==
- Baggage trailer – Towed cargo vehicle
- Boat dolly – Device for launching small boats
- Conflat
- Creeper (tool) – Low-profile tool
- Dolly (trailer) – Trailer connection device
- Electrocar
- Electric platform truck
- Flatbed truck – Type of truck
- Flatcar – Type of railroad car for transporting large objects, containers, or machinery
- Flat wagon – Railway goods wagon
- Hand truck – L-shaped box-moving handcart
- Stone-boat – Towed sled for hauling heavy objects
- Tie down strap – Load securing webbing
- Toy wagon – Small four-wheeled cart for play
- Trolley (disambiguation)
- Wheelbarrow – Small hand-propelled vehicle
