= SS Murillo =

Murillo has been the name of a number of steamships.

- Murillo (steamship), involved in a collision with Northfleet in 1873.
- SS Murillo (1915), in service with Lamport and Holt 1915–32.
- SS Murillo (1942), in service with Lamport and Holt 1946–52.
