= Trolley Station =

Trolley Station or Trolley station may refer to:

- a tram stop, a designated stopping point for a tram, streetcar, or light rail vehicle so that passengers can board or alight
- Audubon Trolley Station, a historic trolley shelter listed on the National Register of Historic Places, in Wilmington, North Carolina
- Oakton Trolley Station, a historic interurban station listed on the National Register of Historic Places, in Fairfax County, Virginia
- Trolley station (Utah Transit Authority), a light rail station in the Central City neighborhood of Salt Lake City, Utah, at 625 East 400 South
- Williamsburg Bridge Trolley Terminal, an underground streetcar terminal on the Lower East Side of Manhattan, New York City, also called the Essex Street Trolley Terminal or Delancey Street Trolley Terminal
- any of the San Diego Trolley light rail stations: List of San Diego Trolley stations
