= Dolly (trailer) =

Trailer connection device

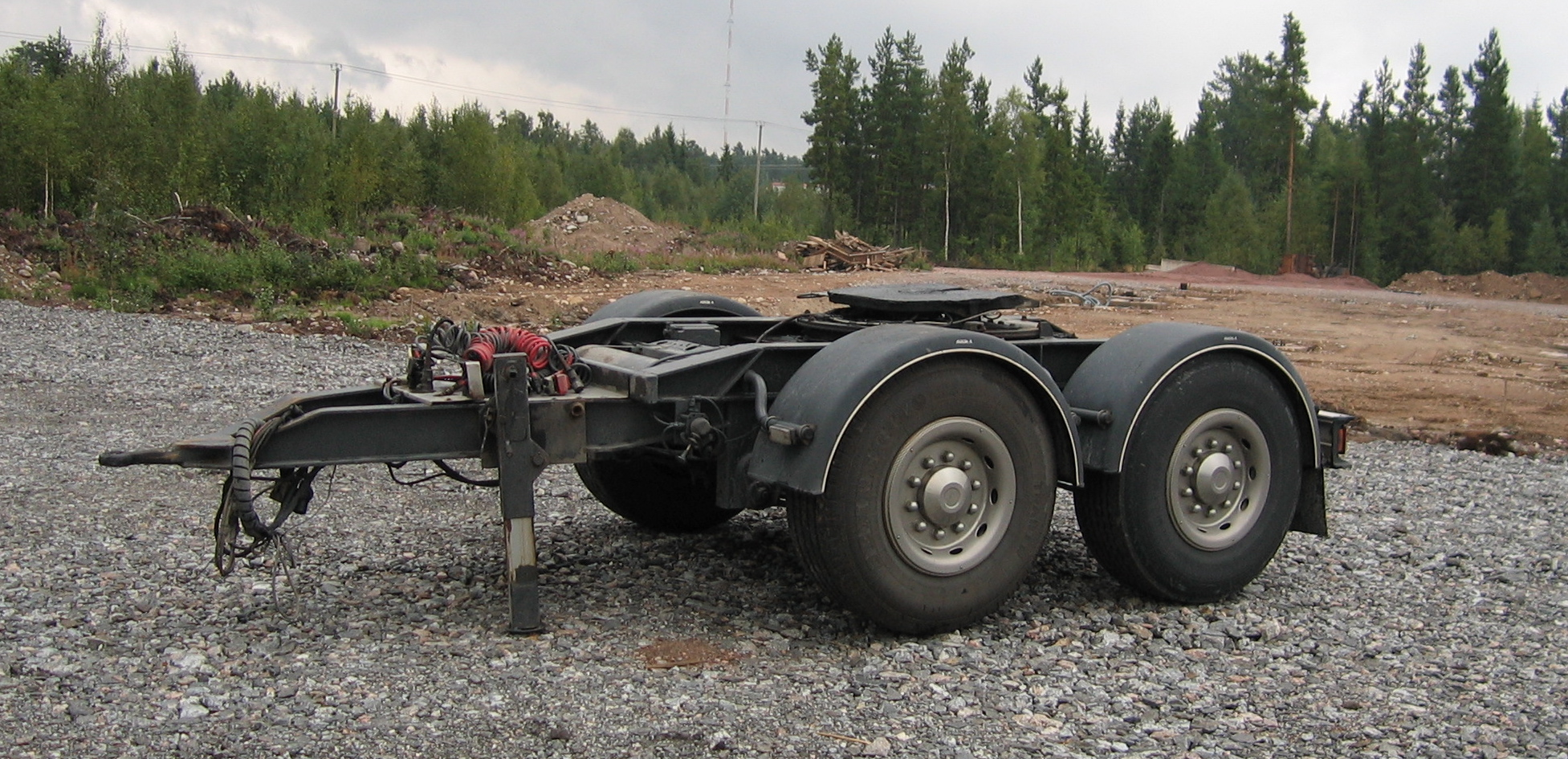
European type dolly trailer

A dolly is an unpowered vehicle designed for connection to a tractor unit, truck or prime mover vehicle with strong traction power.

== United States ==
=== Classification by axle configuration ===
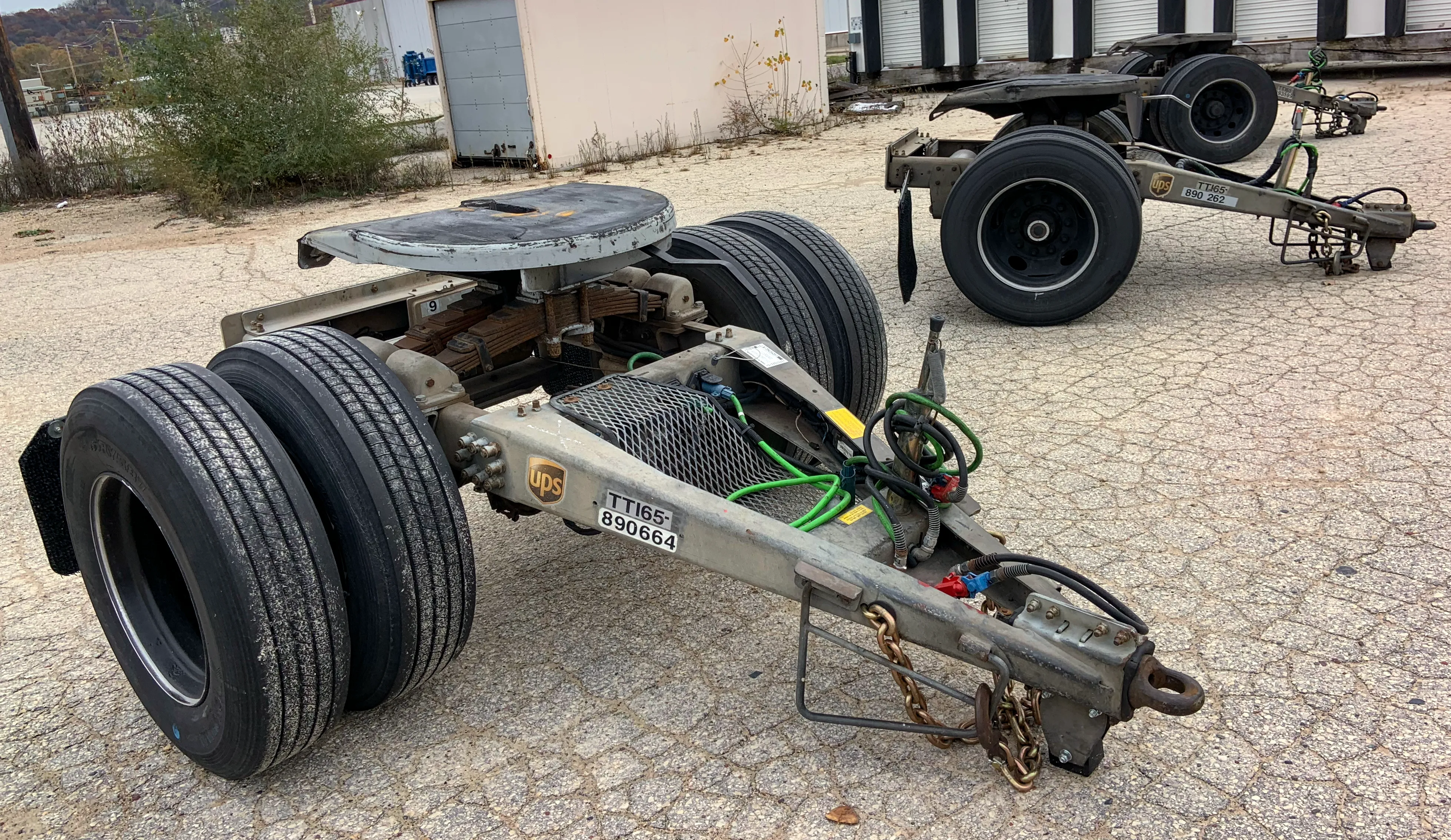
Single axle dolly owned by UPS

There are several types of dolly bogie:

- Full trailer – 2 axles (4 wheels), with a draw bar which also controls the trailer's front axle steering. The draw bar does not take load of the full trailer. Heavy full trailer needs to have its own brakes remotely controlled by the prime mover vehicle.
- Semi-trailer – 1 axle (2 wheels), without the front axle but have a landing gear. Large semi-trailer of truck size is designed for connection via the fifth wheel on the tractor unit or the semi-trailer truck. Small semi-trailer such as travel trailer and boat trailer is designed for connection via a tow hitch of a passenger vehicle. Either the fifth wheel or the tow hitch takes up to half the load of the semi-trailer.
- Road train – special large dolly bogie equipped with a fifth wheel for further connection by the gooseneck type drawbar of another similar dolly and form a road train. The last dolly in a road train needs its own rear lights, brakes remotely controlled by the prime mover vehicle, and registration plate.
- Tow dolly – a semi-trailer designed as automobile rescue equipment. It is designed to couple to the concerned automobile's powered wheel, i.e. the front wheel of a Front-wheel drive automobile, or the rear wheel of a rear-wheel drive automobile, by locking the powered wheels onto the tow dolly's tray. The tow dolly is tow hitch connected to a tractor or truck. Tow dollies are legal in all 50 US states and Canada. In the U.S. and Canada brakes are required on any loaded car tow dolly.

=== Classification by coupling configuration ===
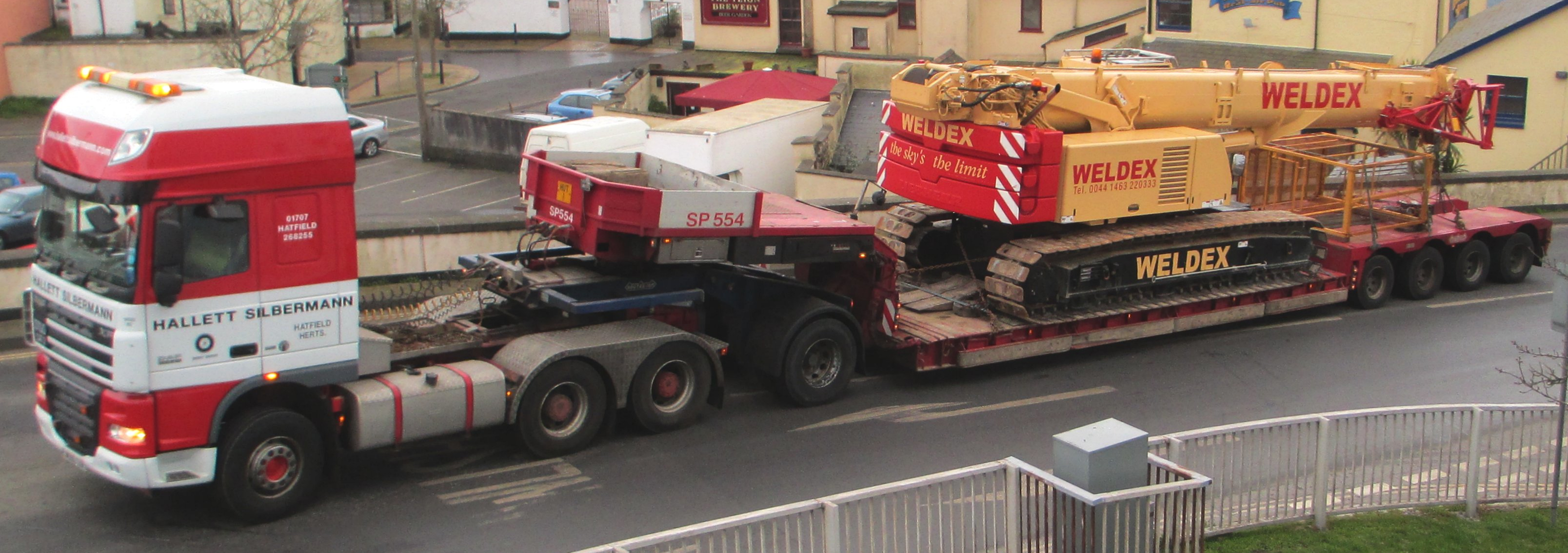
One axled jeep dolly between the trailer and tractor unit

There are two basic types:

- Converter dolly, equipped with between one and three axles and designed to connect to a towbar on the rear of the truck or trailer in front. There are two variants of this:
  - An A-dolly has a single drawbar with a centred coupling.
  - A C-dolly has two separate couplings side-by-side.
- Low loader dolly or jeep dolly, equipped with a gooseneck type drawbar that attaches to the fifth wheel coupling on the rear of a prime mover to distribute the mass on the fifth wheel on the dolly between the prime mover and the wheels of the dolly. These are predominantly fitted with two axles.

== Australia ==
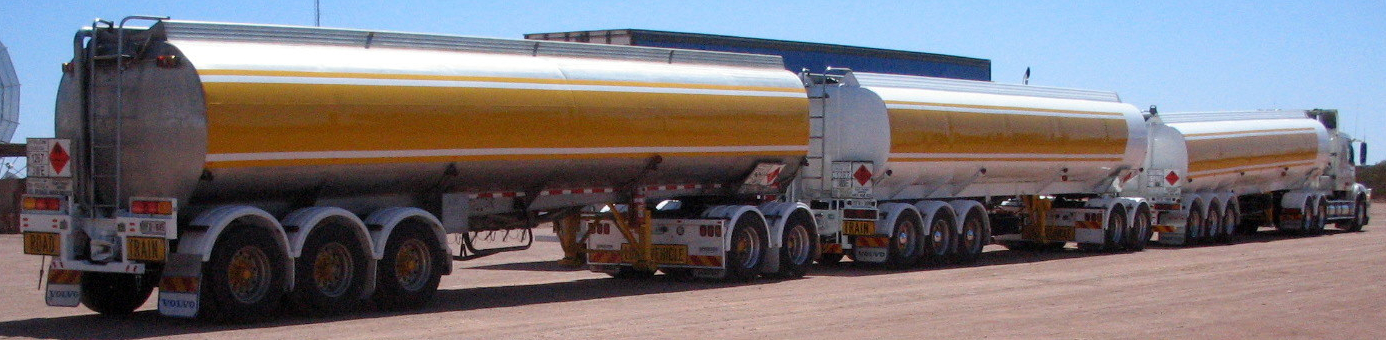
Road train in Australia with dollies

Converter dollies are used in road trains in Australia, most commonly with two or three axles and a hinged drawbar. They are also frequently referred to as road train dollies.

The C-dolly design is not allowed in Australia, as it prevents articulation between the dolly wheels and the axles of the truck or trailer in front of the dolly. Australian rules require articulation between axle groups.

Low-loader dollies – which present a kingpin rather than a drawbar coupling – are used with many low loaders to allow heavy cargo to be carried without overloading the wheels of the prime mover or the low loader.

== Airport dolly ==
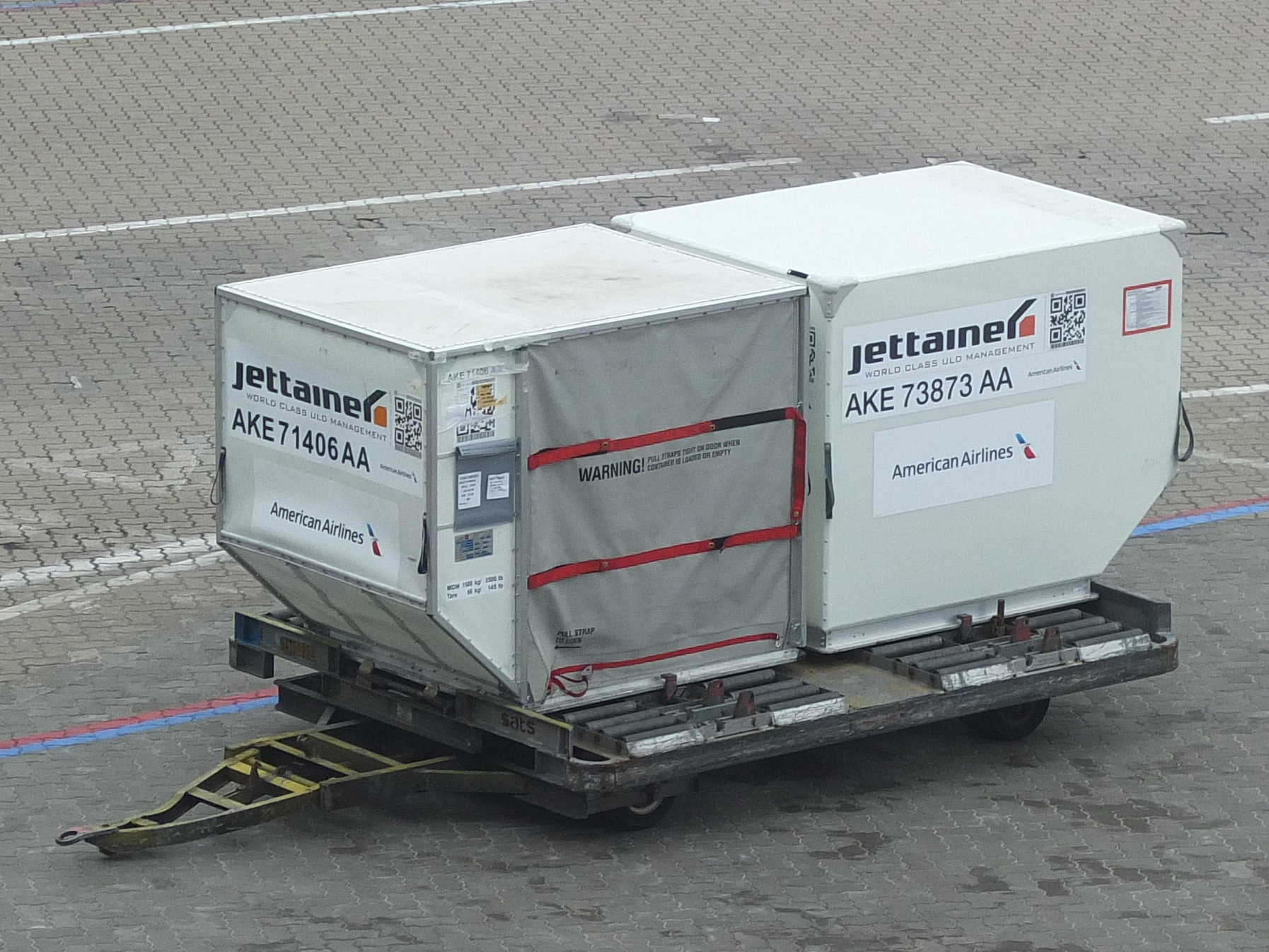
An airport dolly holding two aircraft cargo unit load devices

Dollies are used for the transportation of loose baggages, oversized bags, mail bags, loose cargo carton boxes, etc. between an aircraft and the terminal or sorting facility. In the US, these dollies are called baggage carts, but in Europe baggage cart means baggage trolleys used by individual passengers.

== Aircraft ground carriage ==
An aircraft ground carriage / ground power assisted takeoff and landing concept is a landing gear system connected to the ground, on which aircraft can take off and land without their aircraft-installed landing gear.

== See also ==
- Axle track
- Boat dolly
- Federal Bridge Gross Weight Formula
- Flatbed trolley
- Limber, a dolly used with military artillery
- Road train
- Roll trailer
- Wheelbase
