= Electric platform truck =

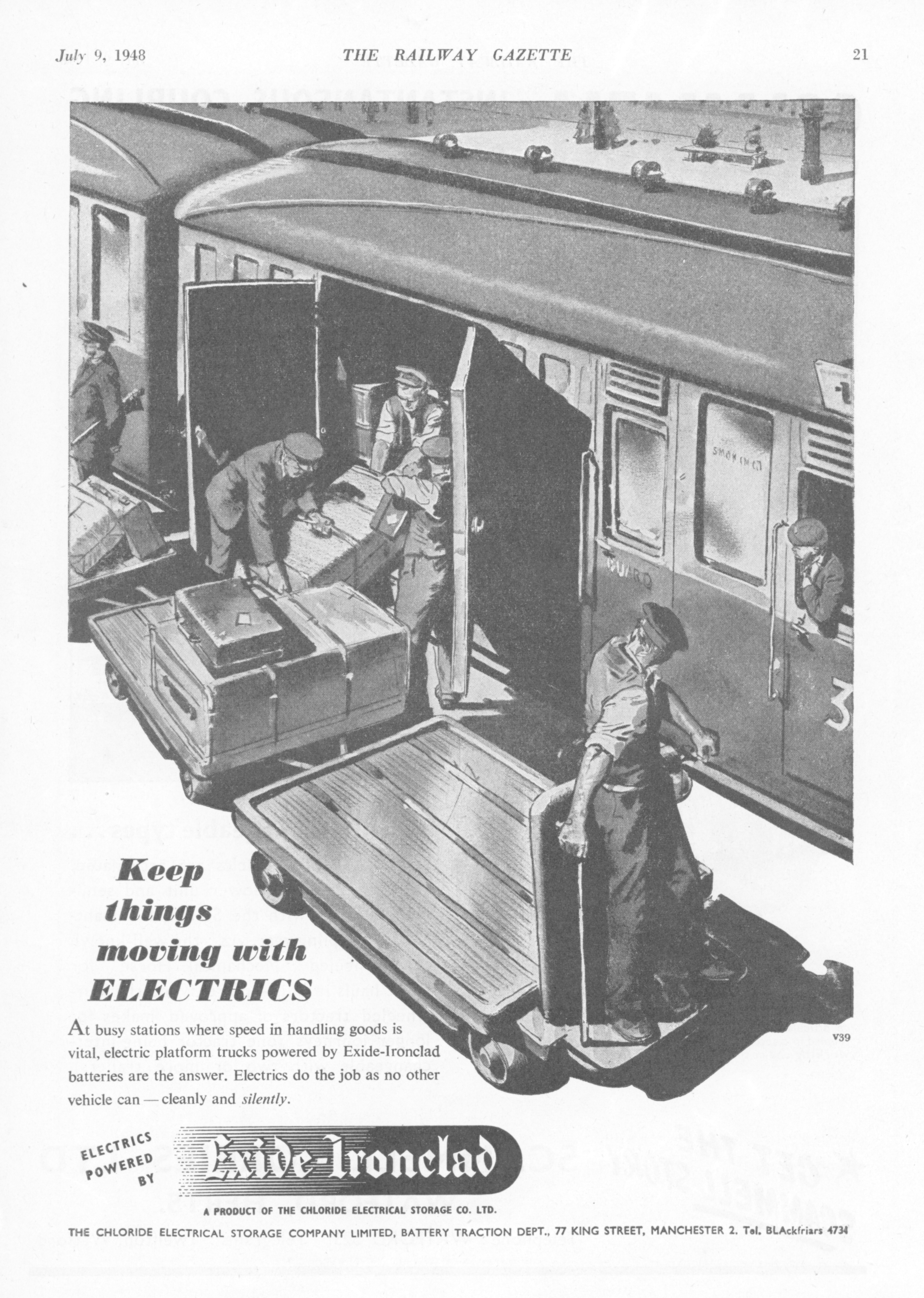
1948 advertisement for Exide-Ironclad batteries for electric platform trucks

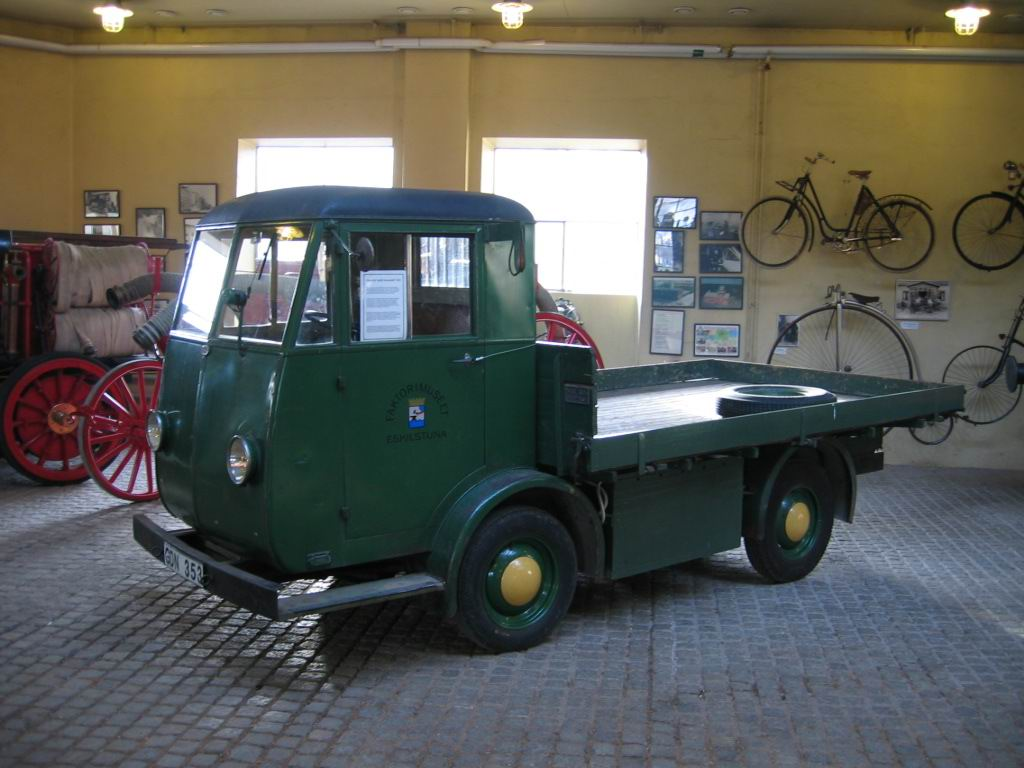
Electrical truck, built by SEA (Svensk Elektrobil AB) in 1943. The truck can go about 45–50 km (28–31 mi) on one charge, at a maximum speed of 30 km/h (19 mph).

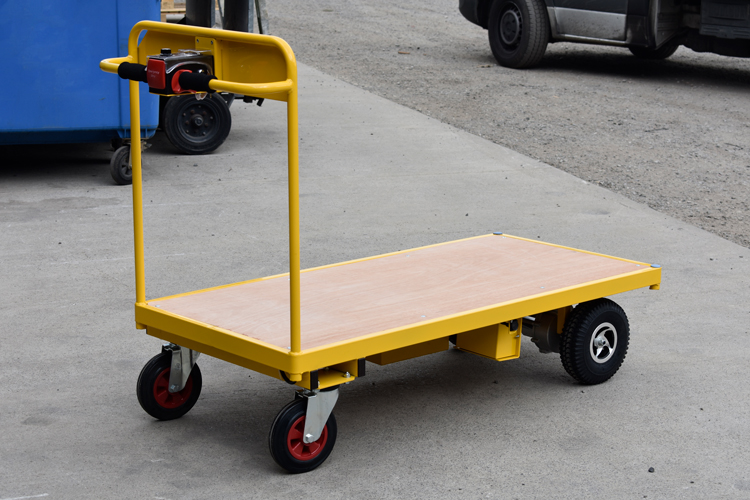
Electric pedestrian platform trucks, otherwise known as electric trolley carts, are primarily used in warehouses and offices where access for larger platform trucks and utility vehicles can be limited. These powered trolleys also provide additional safety benefits over unpowered trolleys such as electronic dead-man braking.

Electric platform trucks are electric powered trucks with a large flat surface for holding objects to be transported. Some are also called warehouse utility vehicles, electric trolley carts, or powered platform truck vehicles. Electric platform trucks can vary greatly in size, from large ride-on utility vehicles, to much smaller pedestrian operated trolleys. Electric tugs can be combined with nonpowered carts or hand trucks to achieve the same result.

A milk float is a specialised version of an electric platform truck specifically designed for the delivery of fresh milk, common in the United Kingdom.

== See also ==
- Neighborhood Electric Vehicle
