= Murillo (surname) =

Murillo is a Spanish surname. Notable people with the name include:

- Ander Murillo (born 1983), Spanish footballer
- Bartolomé Esteban Murillo (1617–1682), Spanish artist
- Catalina Murillo Valverde (born 1970), Costa Rican writer
- Jeison Murillo (born 1992), Colombian footballer
- Jesús Murillo Karam (born 1947), governor of Hidalgo and attorney-general of Mexico
- Juan Murillo (born 1982), Venezuelan road cyclist
- Manuel Murillo Toro (1816–1880), Colombian president and writer
- Marino Murillo (born 1961), Cuban communist official
- Mario Murillo (footballer) (1927–2012), Costa Rican footballer
- Mario A. Murillo, American journalist, public radio personality, author, and academic
- Óscar Murillo (born 1988), Colombian footballer
- Oscar Murillo (artist) (born 1986), Colombian artist
- Pedro Domingo Murillo (1757–1810), independentist leader of Bolivia
- Pedro Murillo Velarde (1696–1753), Spanish Jesuit and cartographer of the Philippines
- Soledad Murillo (born 1956), Spanish academic and politician
- Teddy Murillo (died 2010), Belizean shooting victim
