= Sleigh =

Horse-drawn passenger vehicle on runners

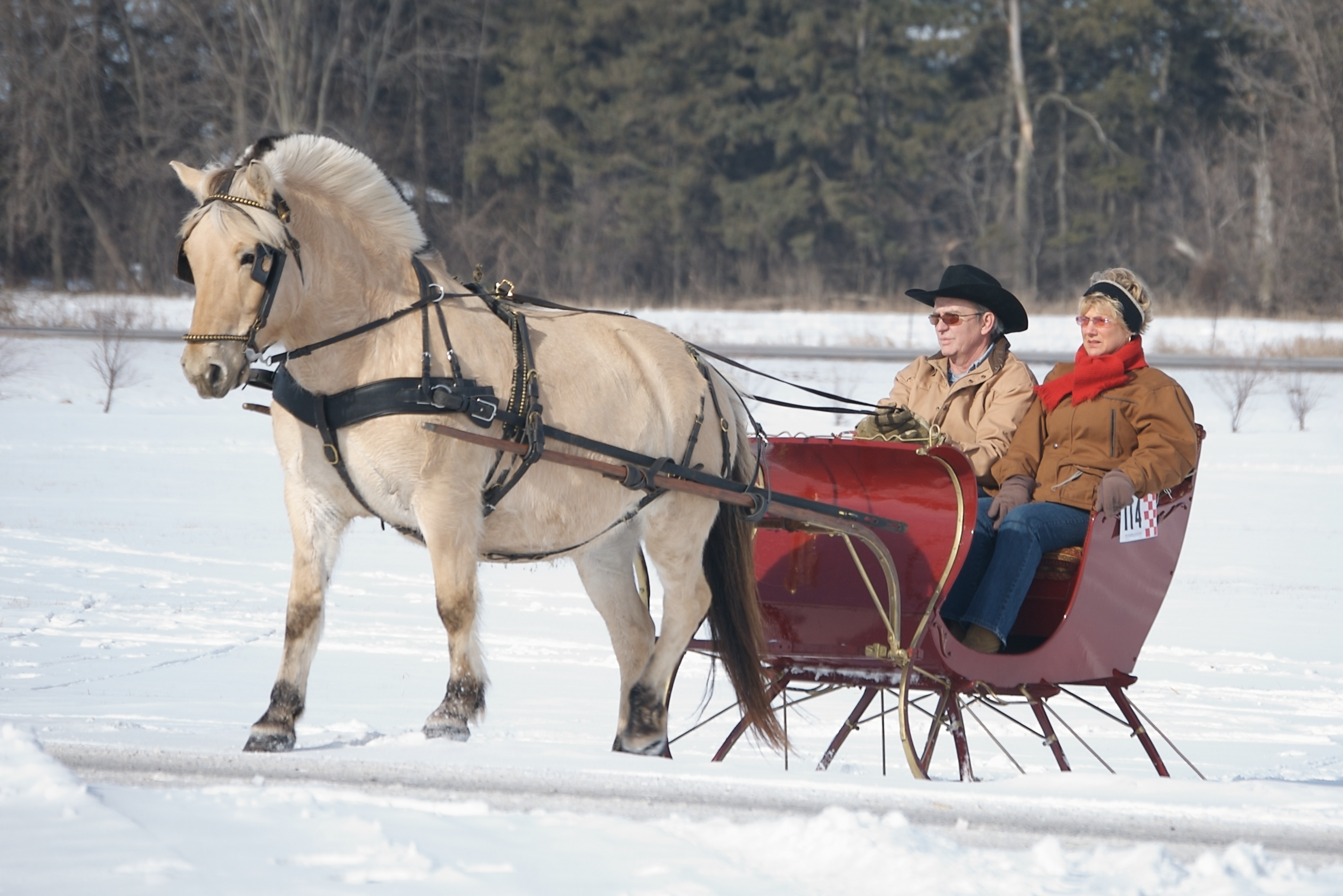
A horse-drawn cutter-style sleigh

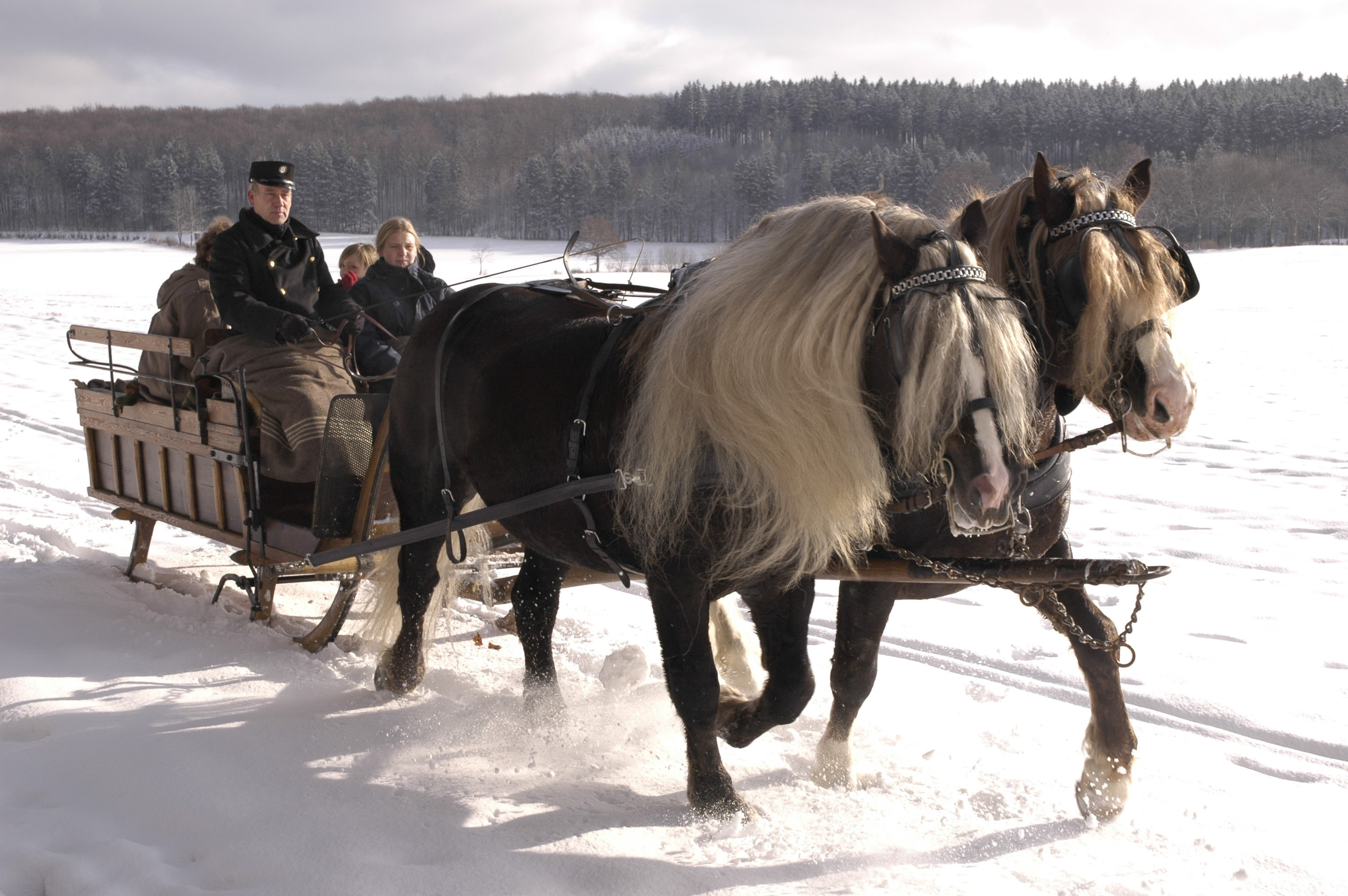
A pair of Black Forest Horses pulling a large sleigh with wagonette seating

A sleigh (pronounced "slay") is a horse-drawn vehicle mounted on runners for travel over snow or ice and pulled by one or more horses. Sleighs are used for winter transport, agricultural work, and pleasure. They were historically used in regions with long winters as a practical means of transport, and they remain culturally associated with winter travel and holiday traditions. Sleighs are distinct from sledges, which are typically a low heavy-duty load-hauling platform for pulling across all surfaces, not just snow and ice.

== Design ==
Horse-drawn sleighs consist of a body or platform mounted on runners, usually made of wood shod with metal. The runners curve upward at the front to prevent digging into snow. Above the runners sits the body, which may be open or partially enclosed and typically includes seating for one or more passengers. Construction materials vary from simple wooden frames to elaborately decorated bodies with upholstery, paintwork, and metal trim.

Sleighs are pulled by one or more horses using a harness attached to shafts or a pole. Designs range from simple flat platforms used for hauling to lightweight passenger vehicles.

Because sleighs and hoof-fall on snow make almost no noise, bells are often attached to the harness so people can be alerted to approaching vehicles.

== Variations ==
A cutter is a type of North American sleigh, lightweight with a single seat for two people and pulled by a single horse. It has a high "S"-shaped curving dash. The term was first used in the United States around 1800. The Albany and Portland cutters were the most popular, and widely copied. A double sleigh had two seats for four people, and six-passenger sleighs were also built on the Albany and Portland styles.

Bob runners are runners used to convert a regular carriage or wagon into a sliding vehicle for winter by replacing each wheel with bob runners. A bob sled is a sled (composite runners and platform); two were placed in tandem underneath vehicle bodies, giving the entire vehicle the colloquial name "bob sled", also called a double-ripper. Both variations are sometimes simply called bobs.

A booby-hut or Boston booby is an enclosed sleigh made with a coach or chariot body suspended on sleigh runners by leather thoroughbraces; a New England term.

A Troika is a Russian method of hitching three horses abreast to a sled or a wheeled carriage.

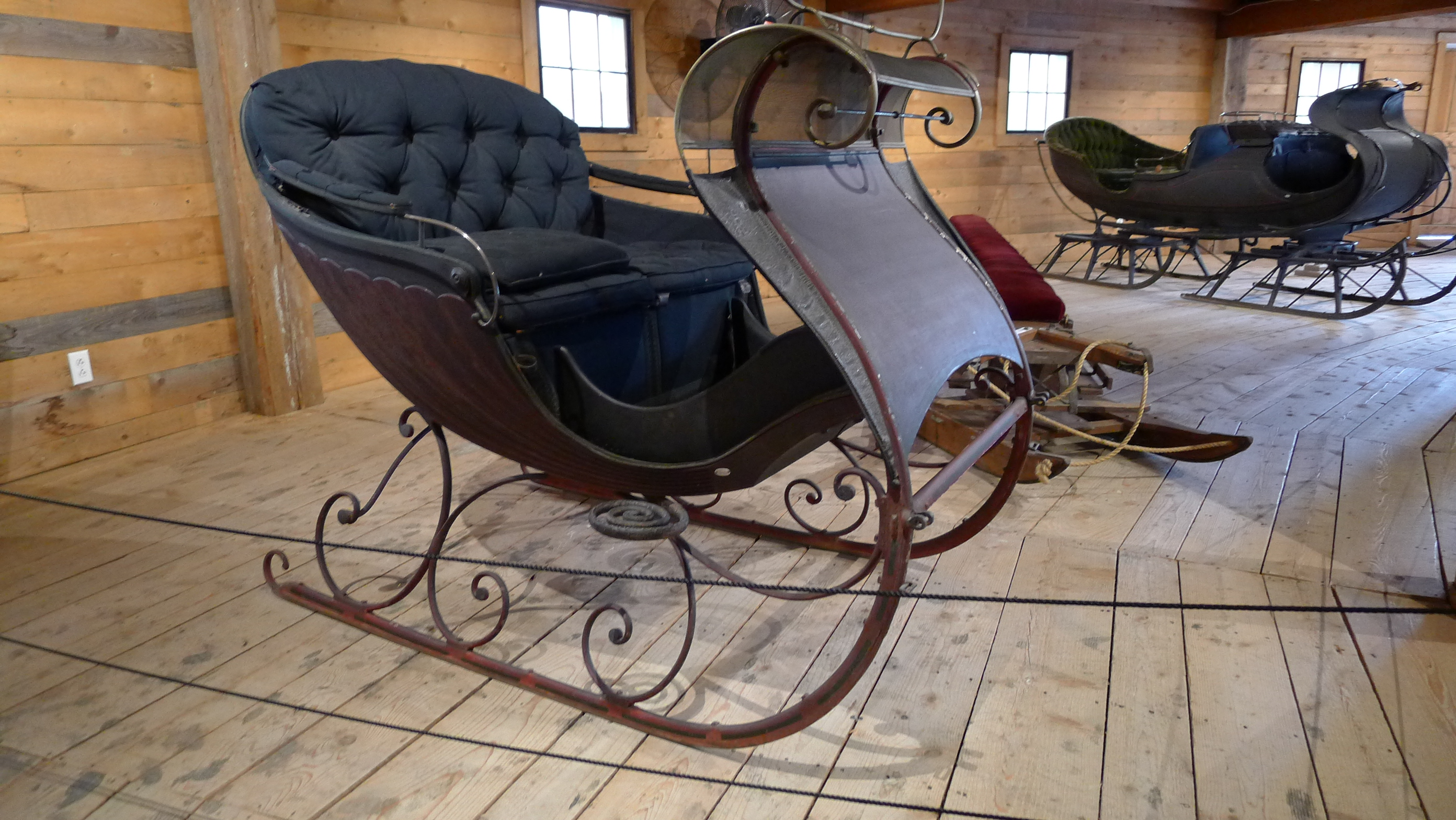
Cutter (foreground)

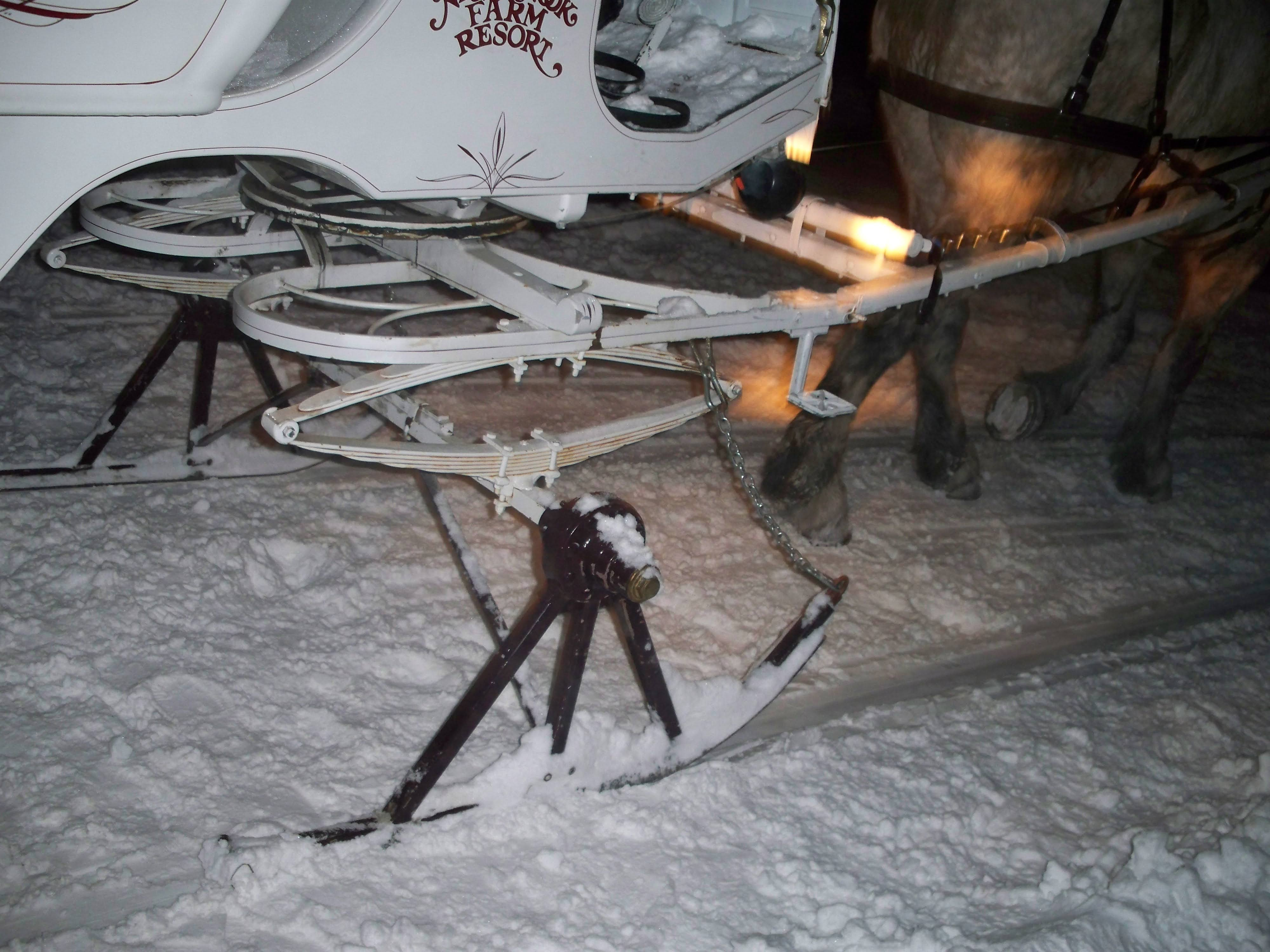
Bob runners replace the wheels on this carriage

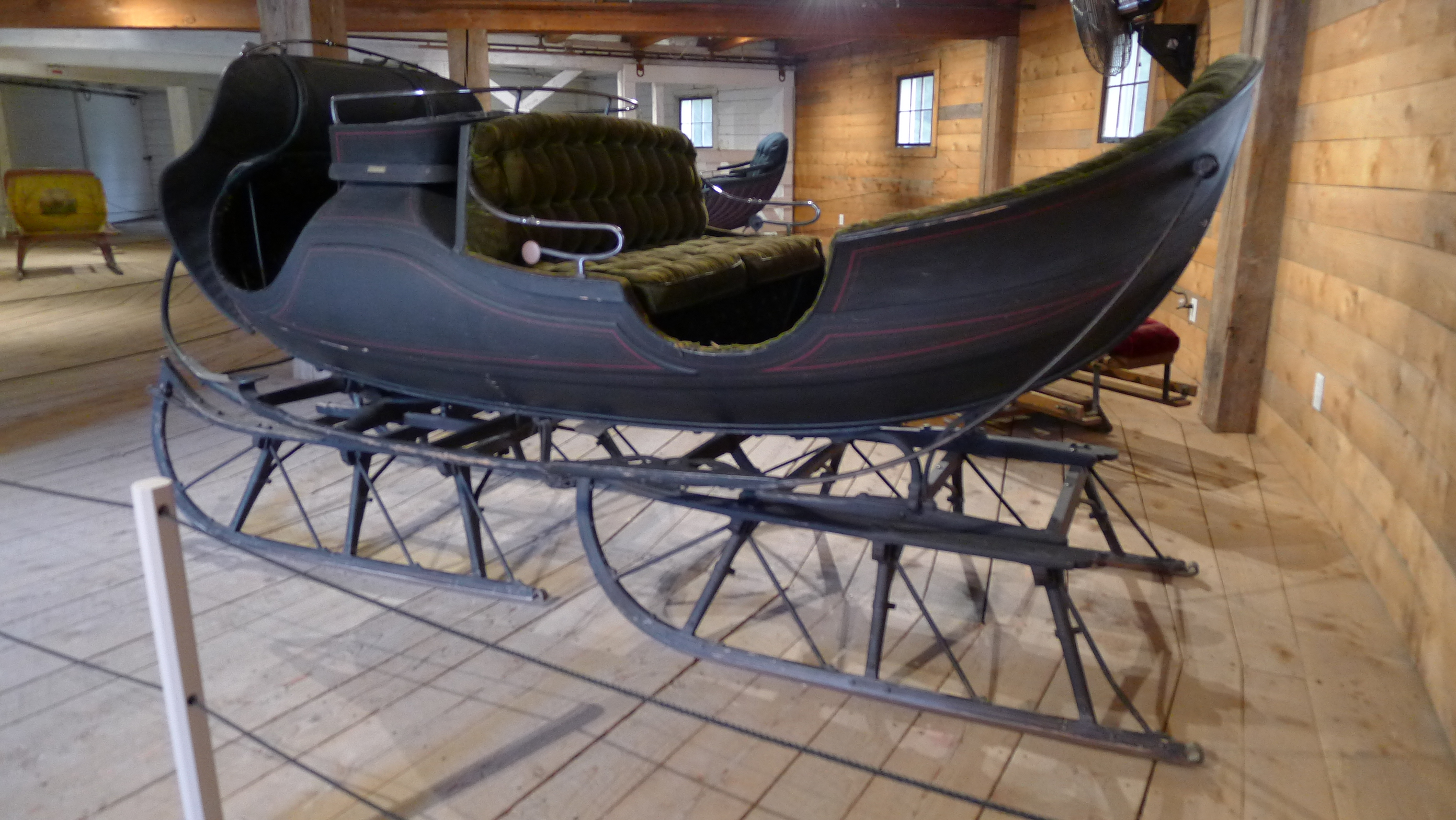
6-person sleigh on two sets of bobs, calling this a bob-sled

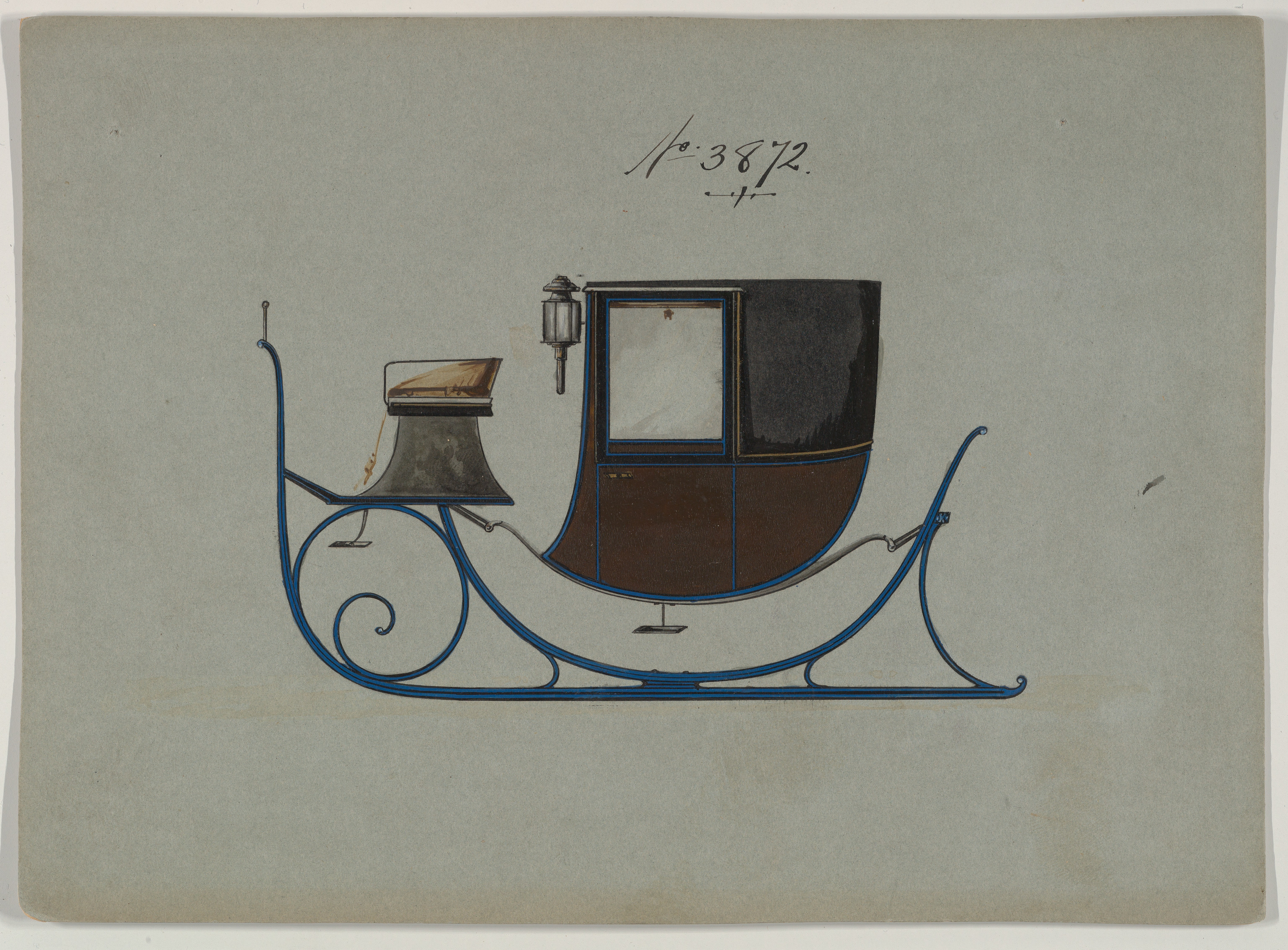
A booby-hut design

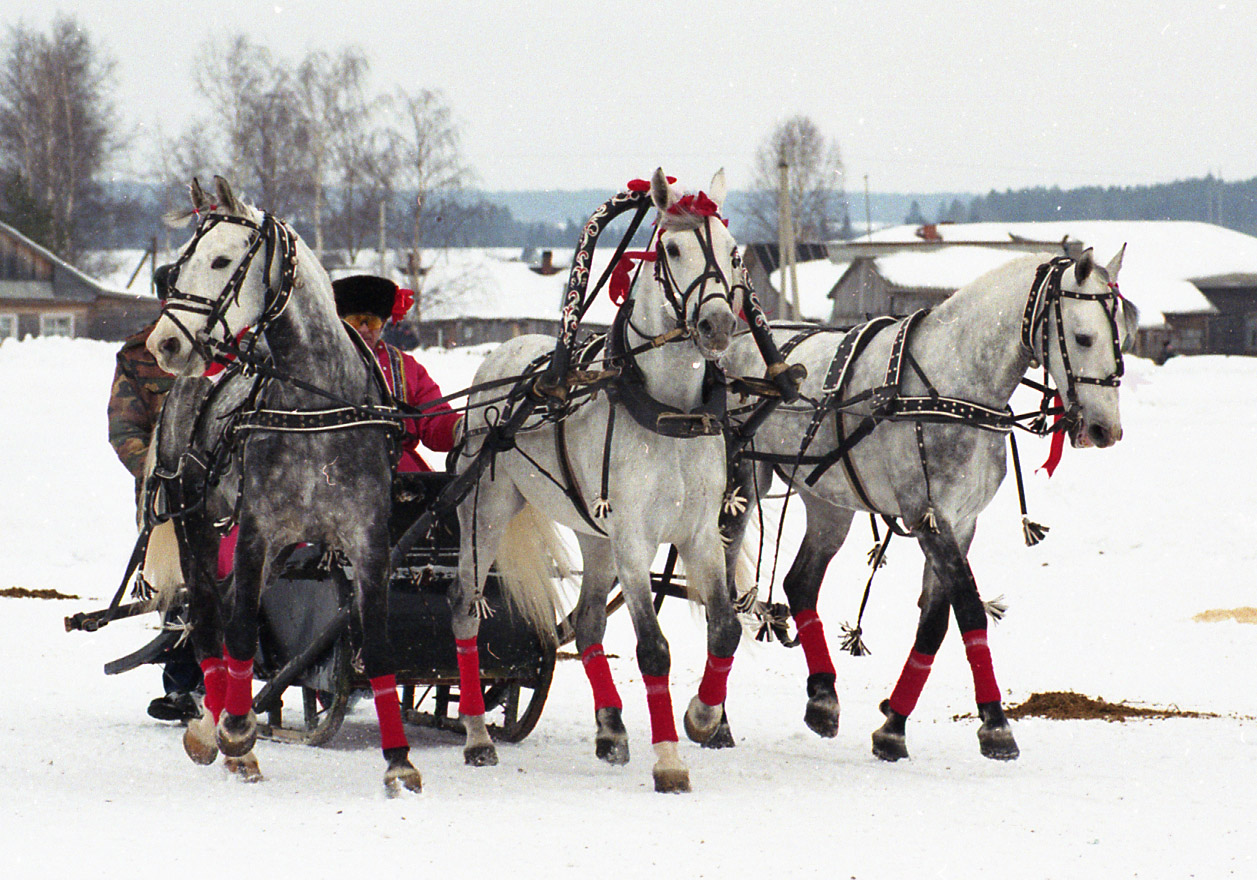
A Troika arrangement pulling a Russian sleigh

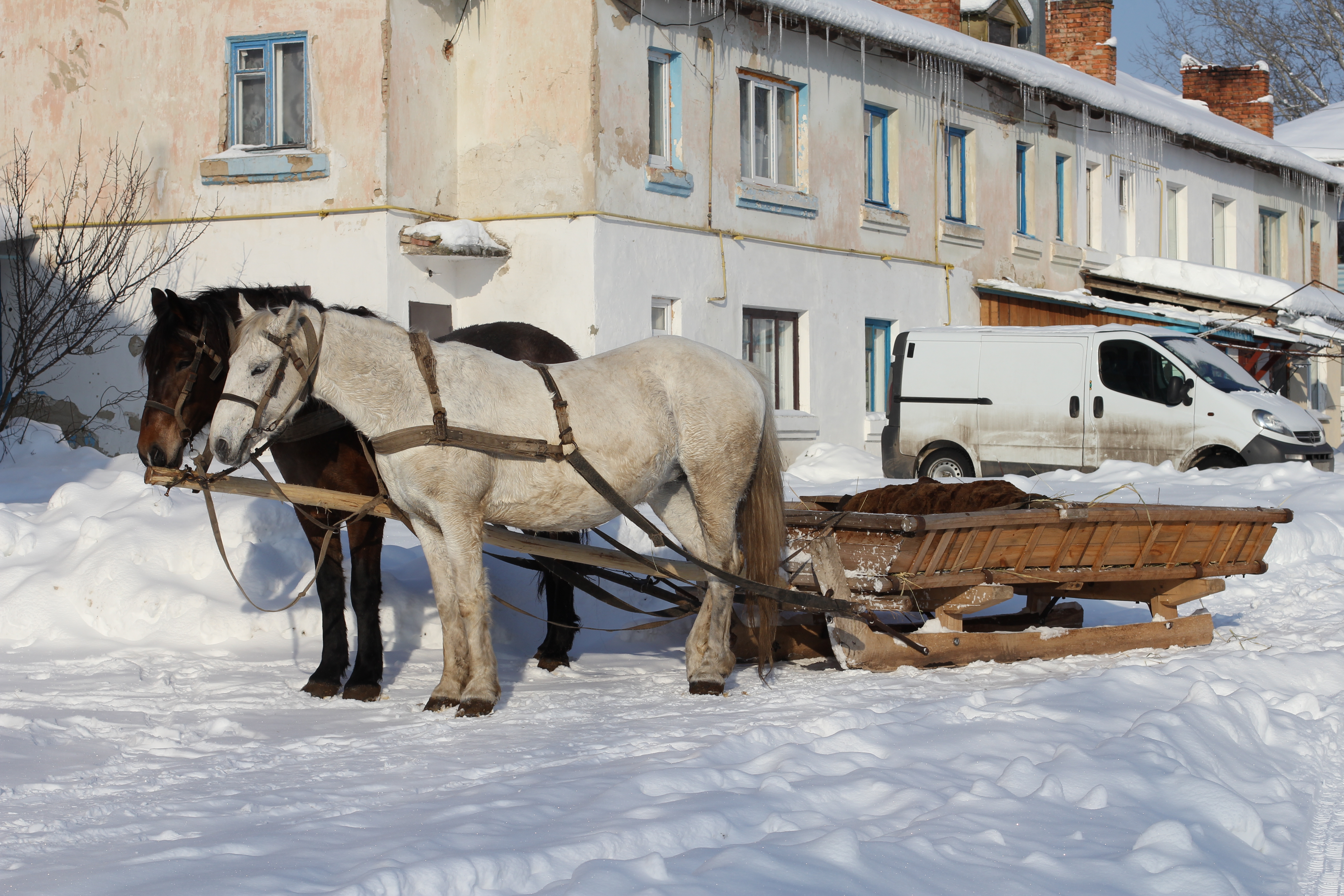
Utilitarian sleigh, Ukraine 2012

== Historical context ==
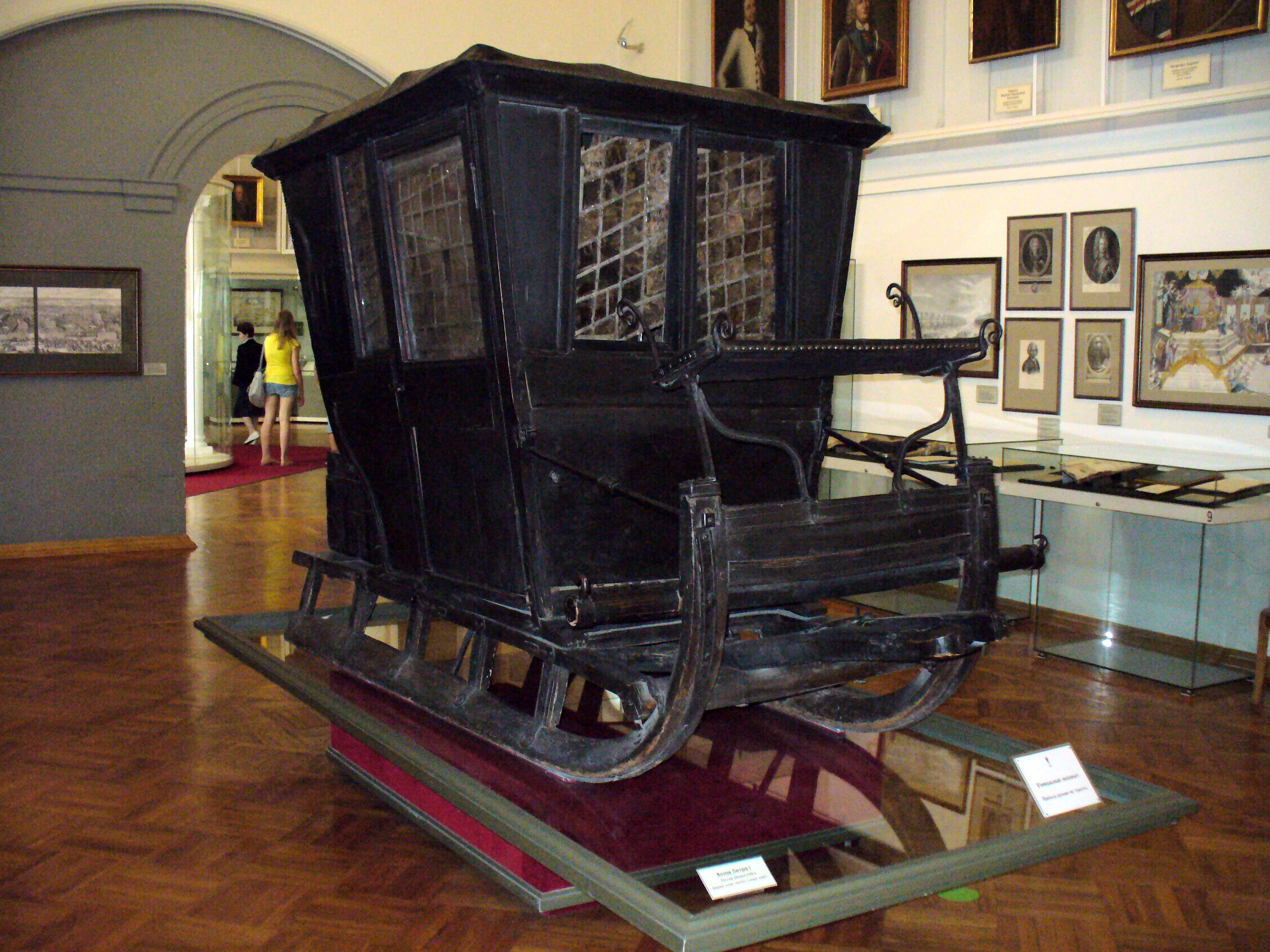
A Russian vozok in a museum

Early sleighs were simple platforms on runners, later evolving into refined passenger vehicles with curved runners, enclosed bodies, and decorative elements. Sleighs were easier than carriages to construct and, lacking wheels and springs, were less costly to build.

For centuries, sleighs were common in northern Europe and Scandinavia, where snow-covered terrain made wheeled vehicles impractical during winter. In Russia, enclosed winter vehicles such as the vozok provided transport for nobles, clergy, and officials across the plains of Muscovy. In Europe and North America, sleighs served as essential winter transport for families, clergy, merchants, and postal carriers. Sleigh rides became a social pastime, and sleigh racing developed as a popular winter sport. The sound of sleigh bells—attached to harnesses as an audible safety signal—became strongly associated with winter travel.

The widespread adoption of plowed roads and motor vehicles in the 20th century led to the decline of everyday sleigh use, though they continue to be used for ceremonial and recreational purposes.

=== Ceremonial sleighs ===
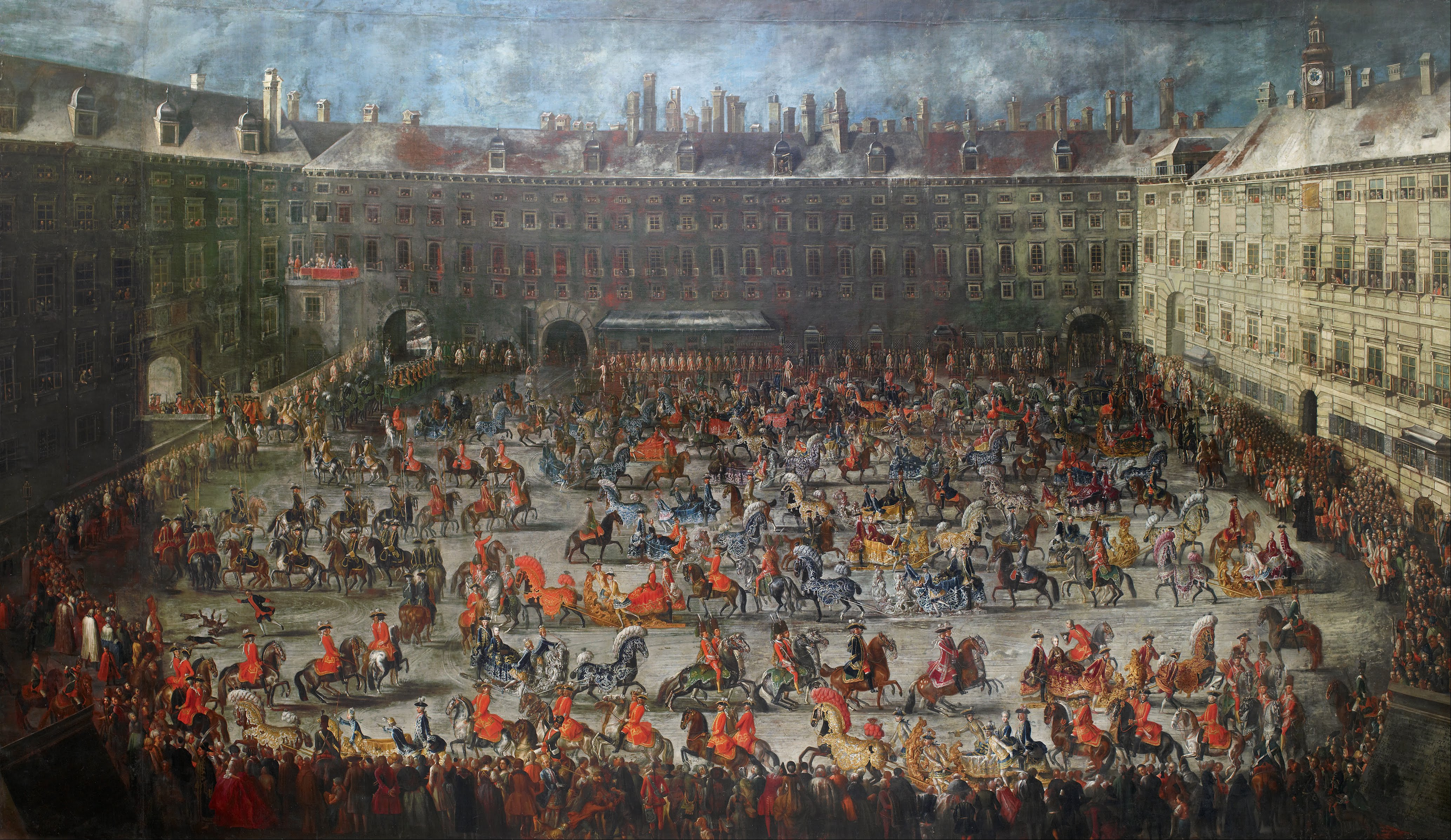
Painting of a 1760s sleigh pageant in the courtyard of the Hofburg Imperial Palace, Austria

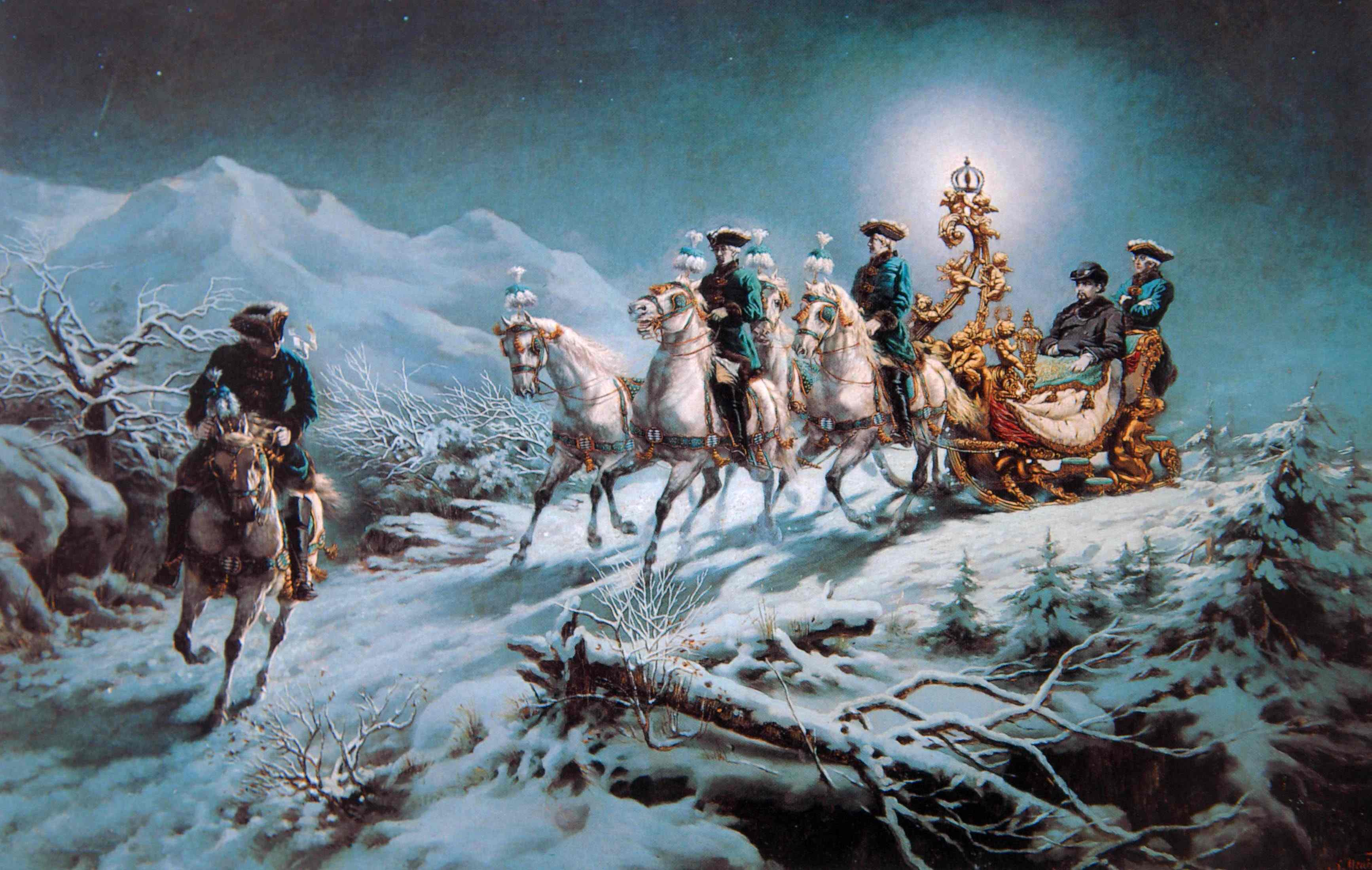
This painting of Ludwig II's night rides shows the arrangement of attendants and horses.

In early modern Europe, sleighs were not only practical winter vehicles but also important elements of court ceremony and public festival culture. From the 17th to the 19th centuries, aristocratic households and royal courts in Russia, Germany, Austria, the Low Countries, and Scandinavia developed traditions of ornate parade sleighs used in winter processions, allegorical pageants, and carnival celebrations. These sleighs were often miniature or lightly built, intended for display rather than travel, and were carved or painted in the form of animals, mythological creatures, ships, or symbolic motifs. The sleighs were guided by postilion (riders) or the horses led by attendants, with a padded extension at the rear for an attendant to ride along. Many examples survive in museums, including the Kunsthistorisches Museum in Vienna, the Bayerisches Nationalmuseum in Munich, the Livrustkammaren (Royal Armoury) in Stockholm, and the State Historical Museum in Moscow.

In 17th‑century Russia, especially under Tsar Alexei Mikhailovich, winter festivities included allegorical parades and costumed processions in which courtiers rode in small, decorative sleighs. These vehicles often took the form of swans, lions, dragons, or ships, and were accompanied by musicians, jesters, and performers. Contemporary engravings by travelers such as Adam Olearius and Cornelis de Bruijn depict these sleighs as part of elaborate Shrovetide celebrations and diplomatic receptions.

In the German‑speaking lands, particularly Bavaria and Austria, Prunkschlitten ("splendor sleighs") formed part of courtly winter culture. These sleighs were richly carved, gilded, and painted, and were used in Fasching (carnival) processions, ceremonial hunts, and aristocratic winter outings. Many 18th‑century examples survive with intact Rococo decoration.

In the Southern Netherlands, decorative sleighs appear in Flemish Baroque winter landscapes and were used in civic pageants and noble promenades. In Sweden and Denmark, sleighs formed part of royal winter processions and noble weddings, often decorated with heraldic motifs or mythological figures.

Ceremonial and parade sleighs

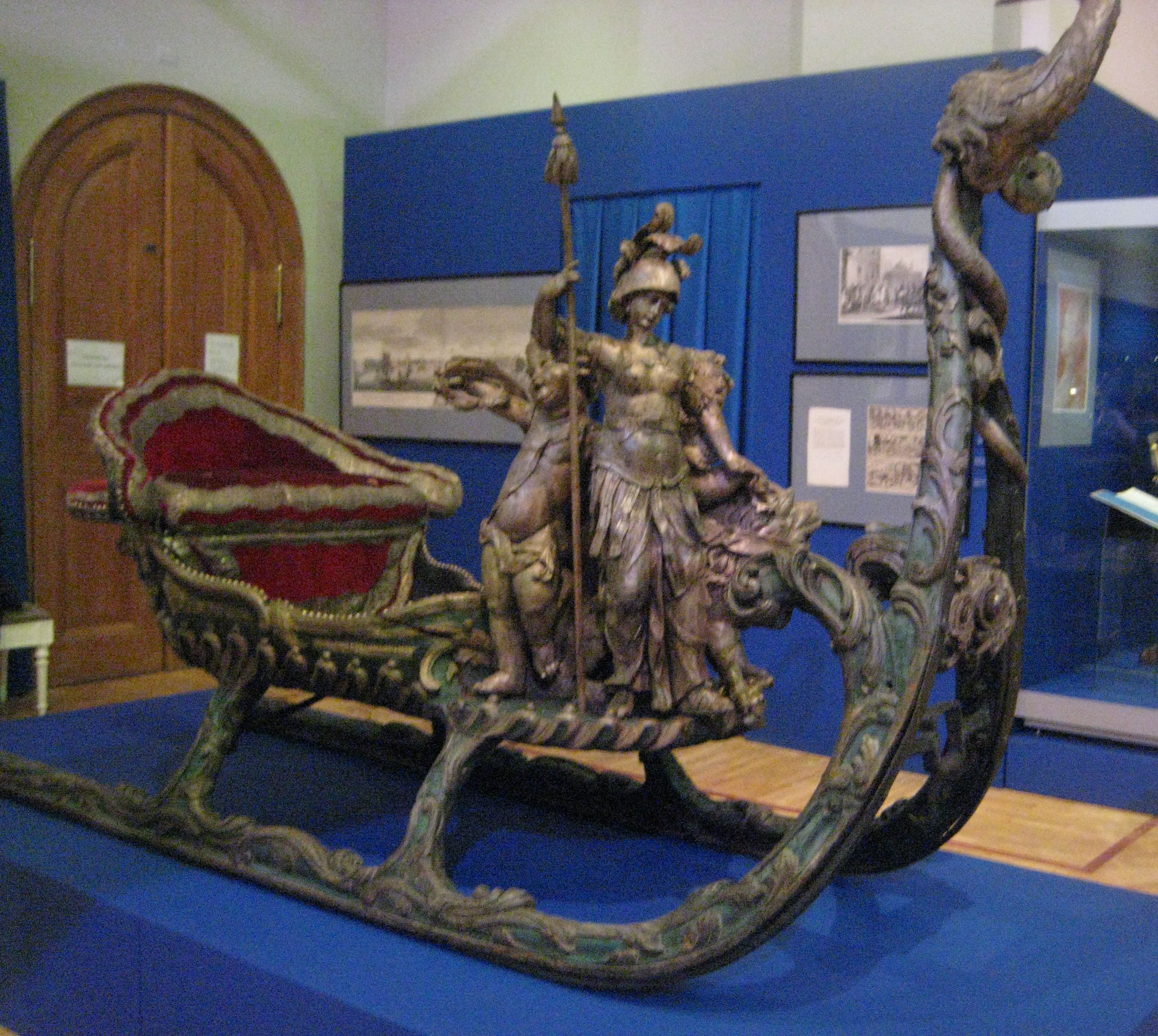
Catherine II's masquerade sleigh in State Historical Museum, Moscow

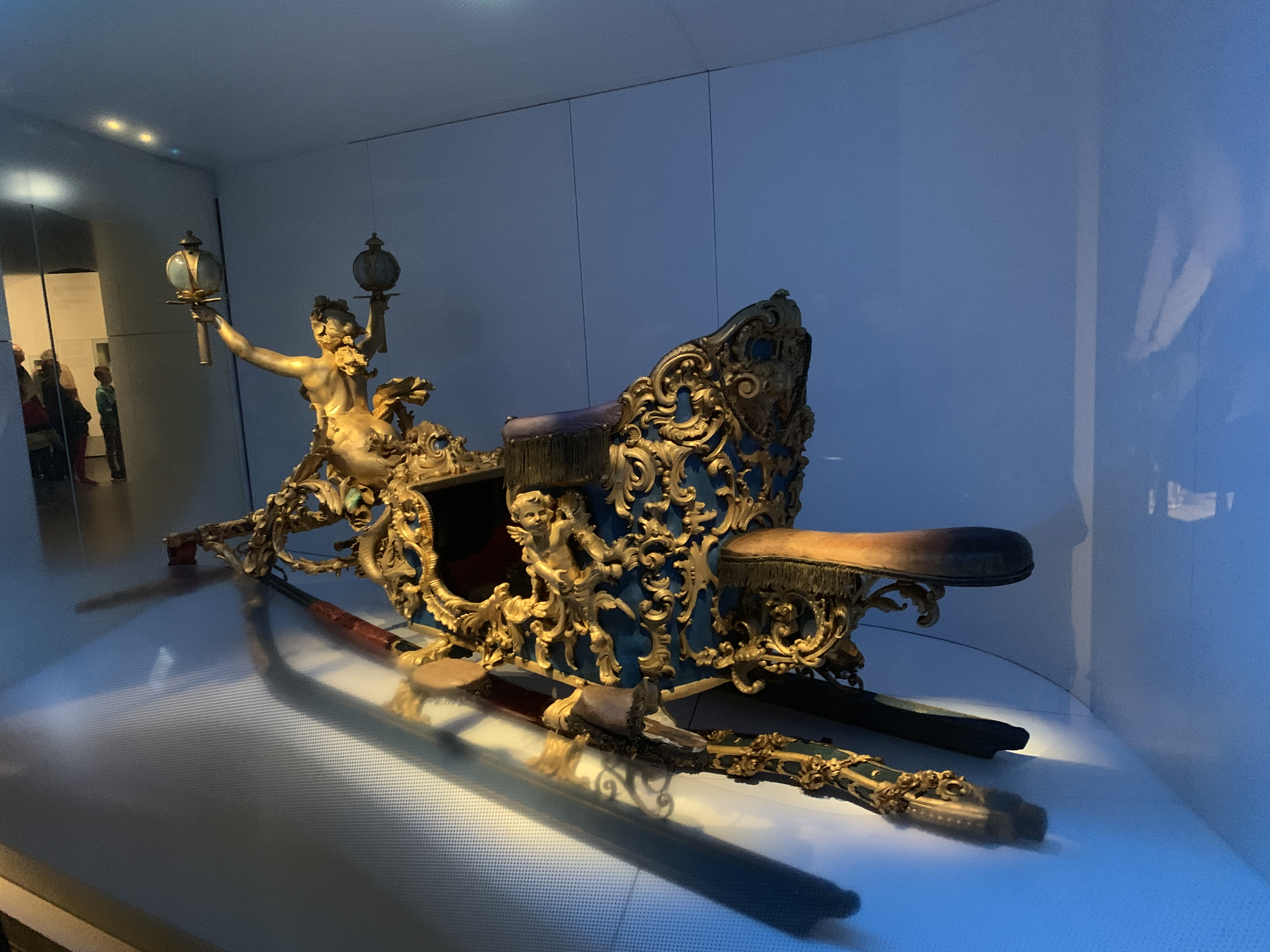
Ludwig II of Bavaria used this elaborate sleigh for moonlit sleigh rides; the lamps produced blue light using electricity from batteries under the seat. Museum der Bayerischen Geschichte, Germany.

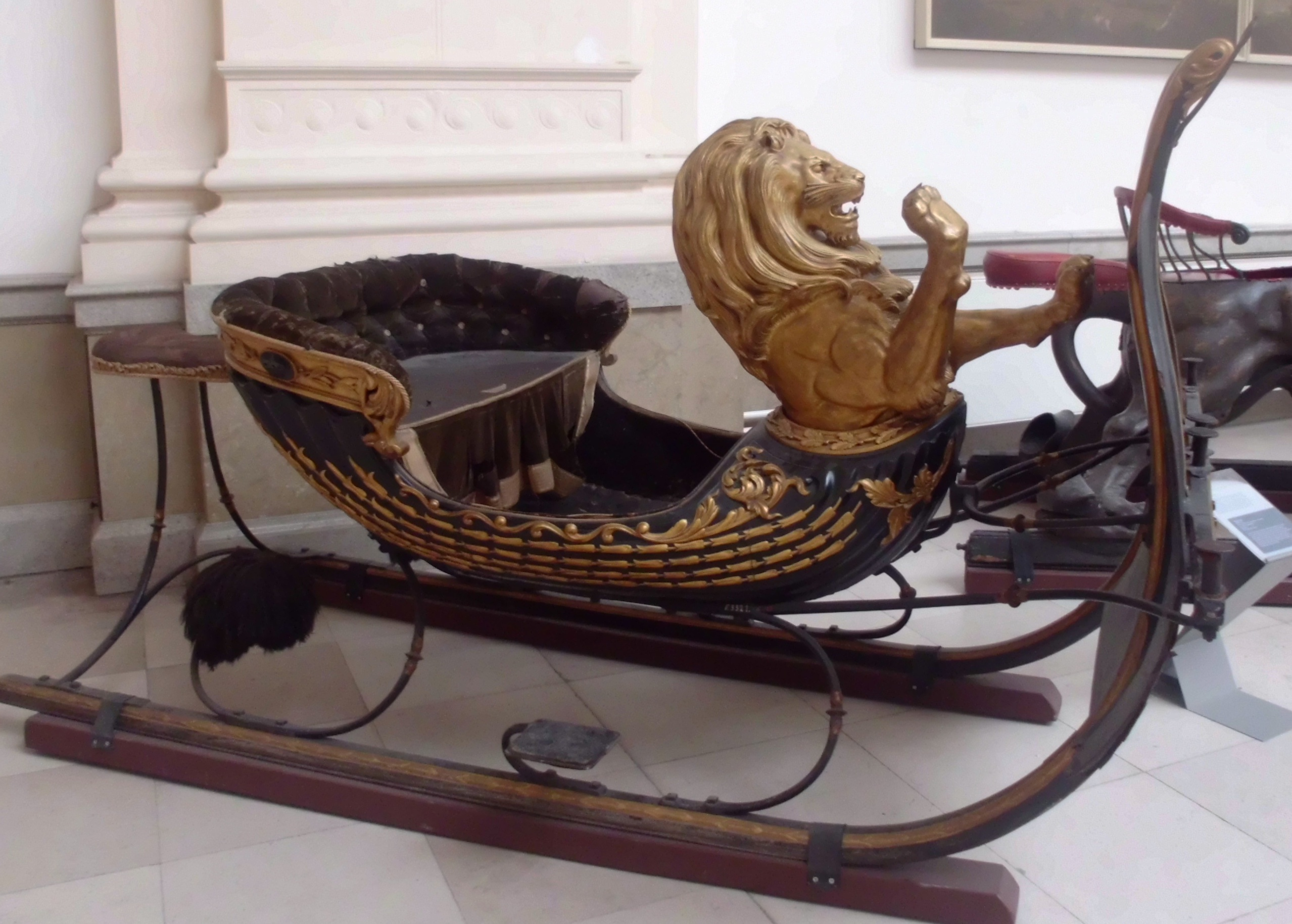
18th c. parade sleigh with gilded lion, Cinquantenaire Museum, Belgium

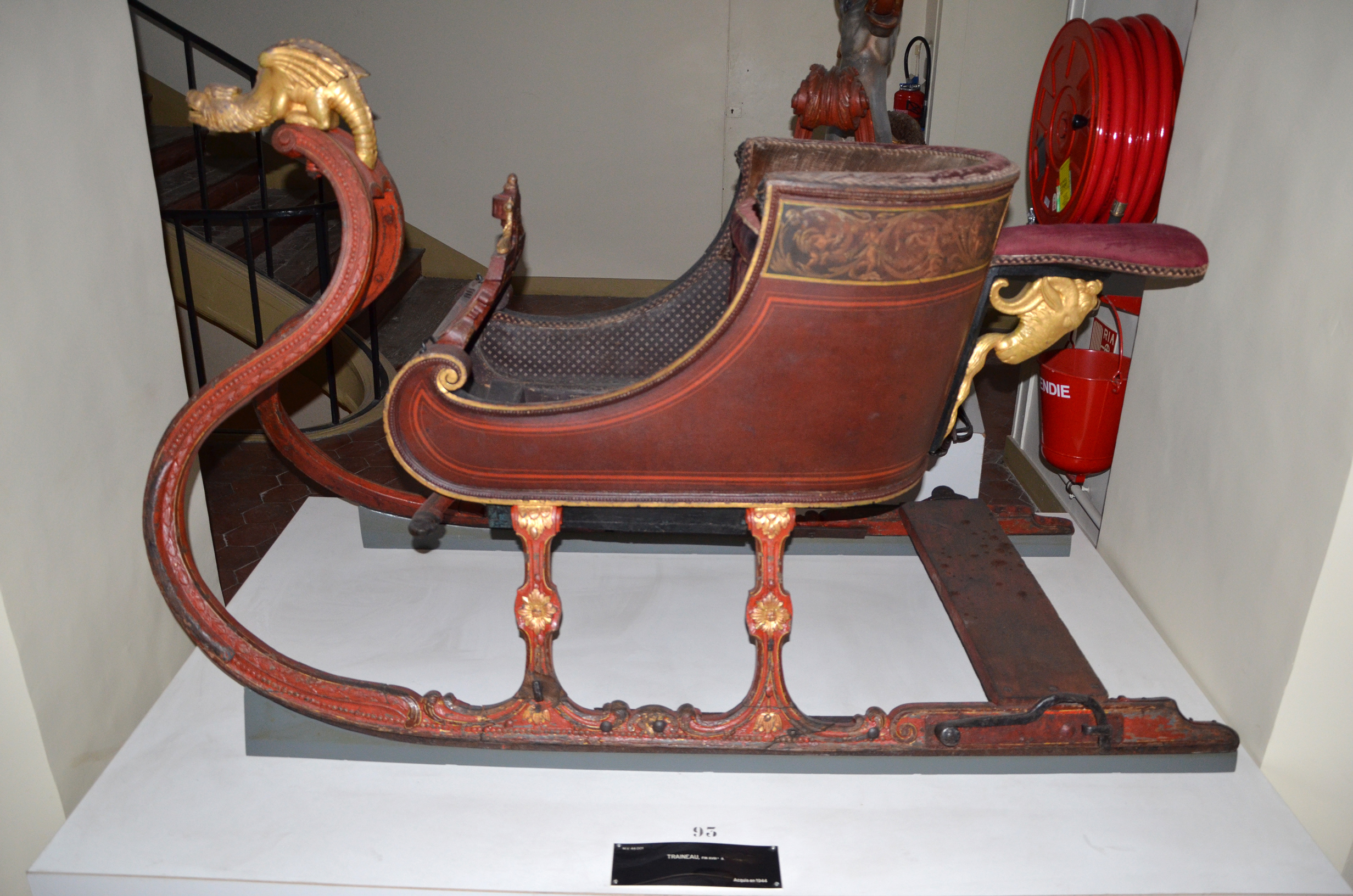
Sleigh with dragon motif, Musée National de la Voiture in France

== Modern usage ==
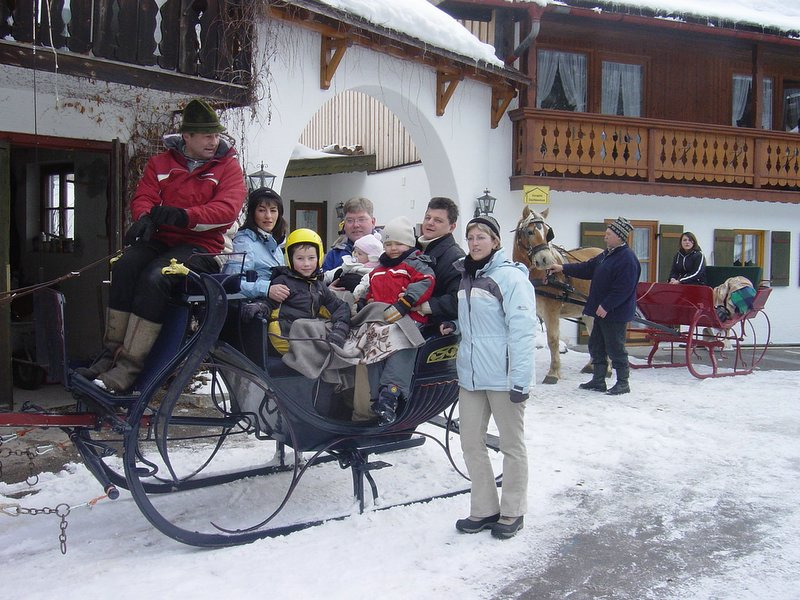
Modern Austrian sleigh for tourist rides

Today, sleighs are used for:

- Pleasure, including racing sports
- Tourism sleigh rides at winter resorts
- Ceremonial events, parades, festivals, and holiday celebrations
- Reenactments, historical demonstrations, and living-history programs
- Preservation of antique sleighs by museums and private collectors
- Winter working use such as bringing feed to pastured livestock

Sleighs hold a prominent place in folklore and winter iconography, most notably in depictions of Santa Claus and his reindeer-drawn sleigh. Sleigh bells have also influenced music and cultural imagery, appearing in winter songs and celebrations.

== Horse-drawn sledges ==
A stone-boat, also called a stone drag or stone sledge, is a flat platform on skids. It is seen in horse pulling and tractor pulling competitions where increasing amounts of weight are added and pulled over a distance to determine the maximum load an animal or machine can pull. Sledges are also seen in horse logging.

Horse-drawn sledges

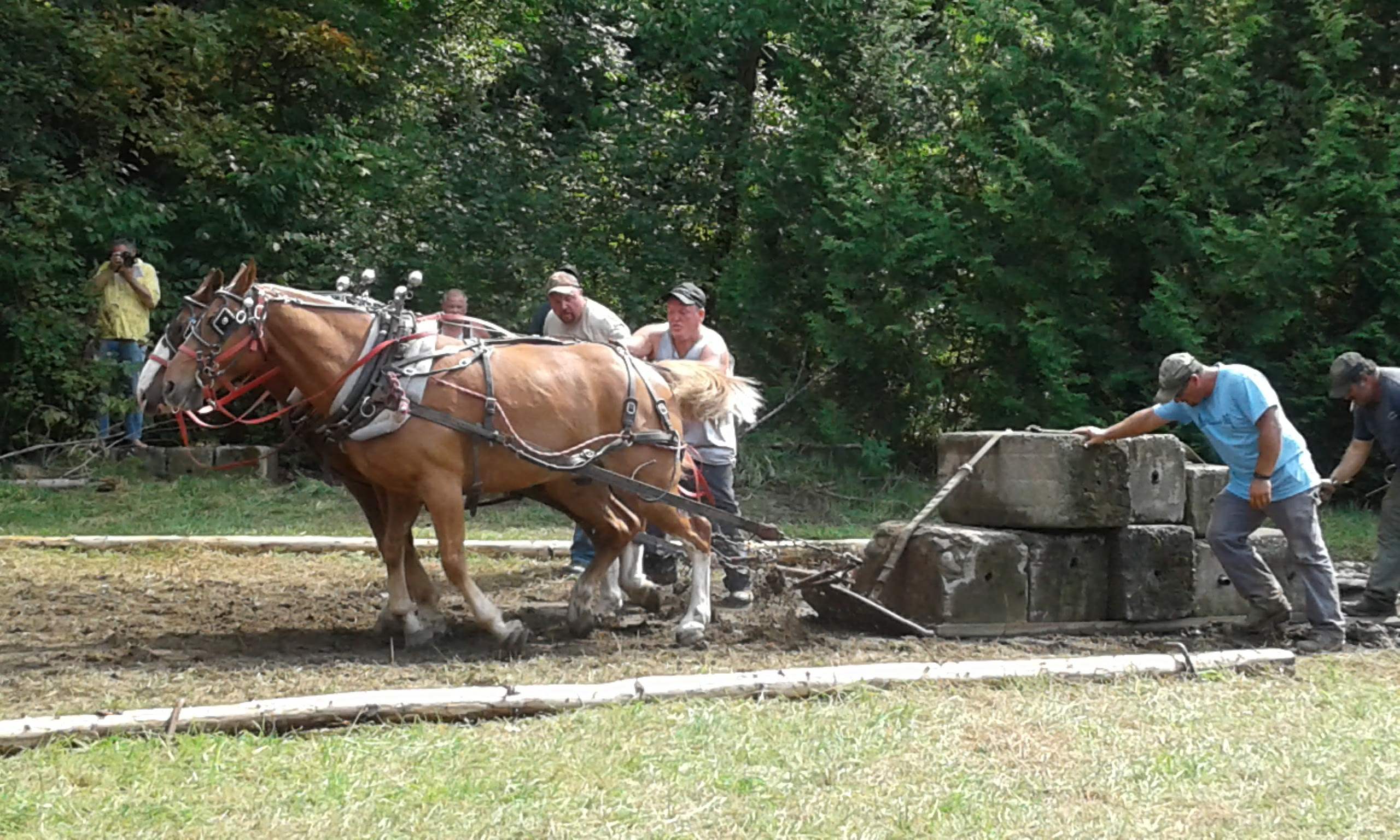
Horses pulling a "stone boat" in a horse pulling competition

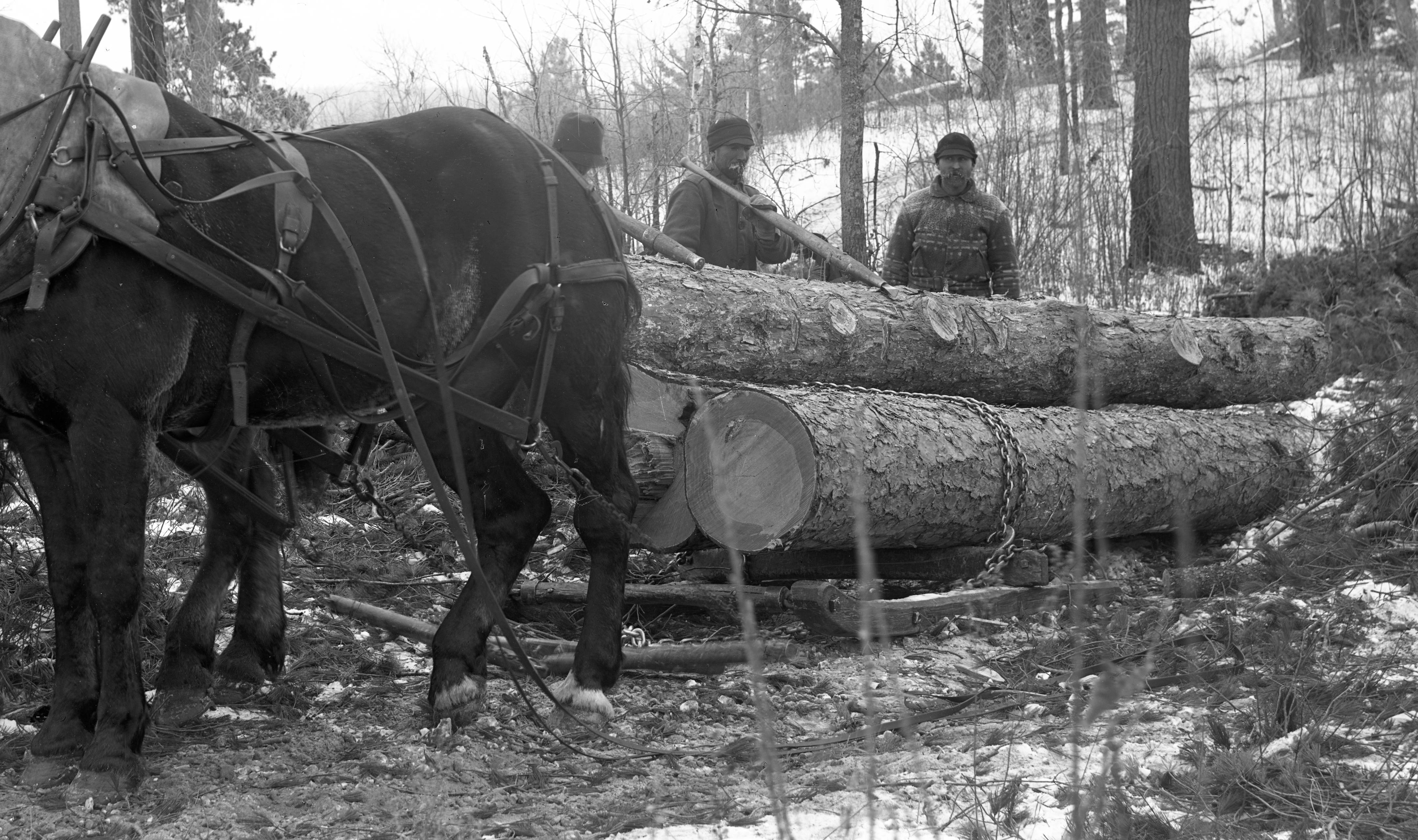
Horse-drawn skidding sledge under front end of logs

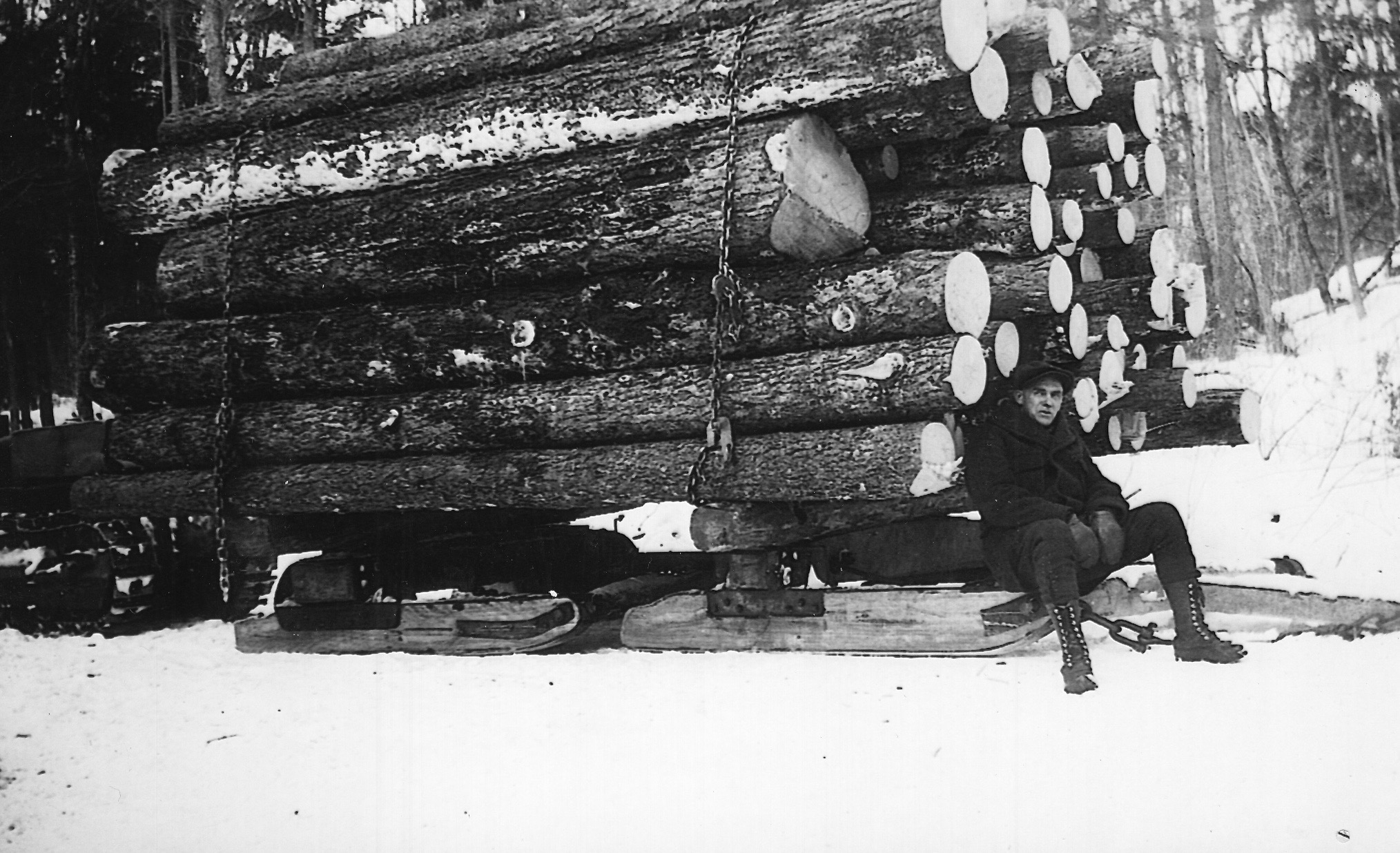
Heavy-duty log transport sledges underneath the logs

== See also ==
- Kulig — a traditional Polish sleigh ride party
