= Horse pulling =

Draft horse competition

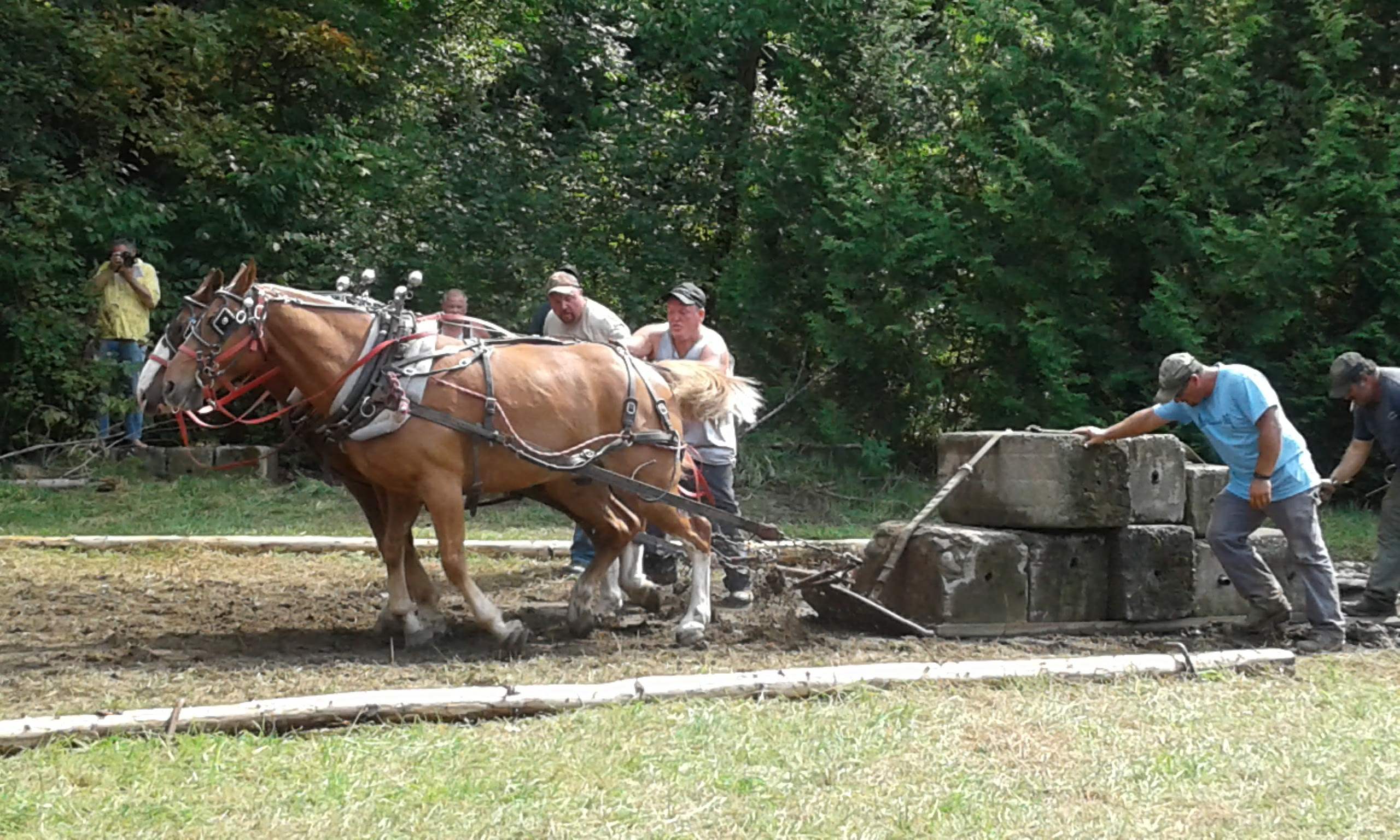
Horse pulling competition, 2017

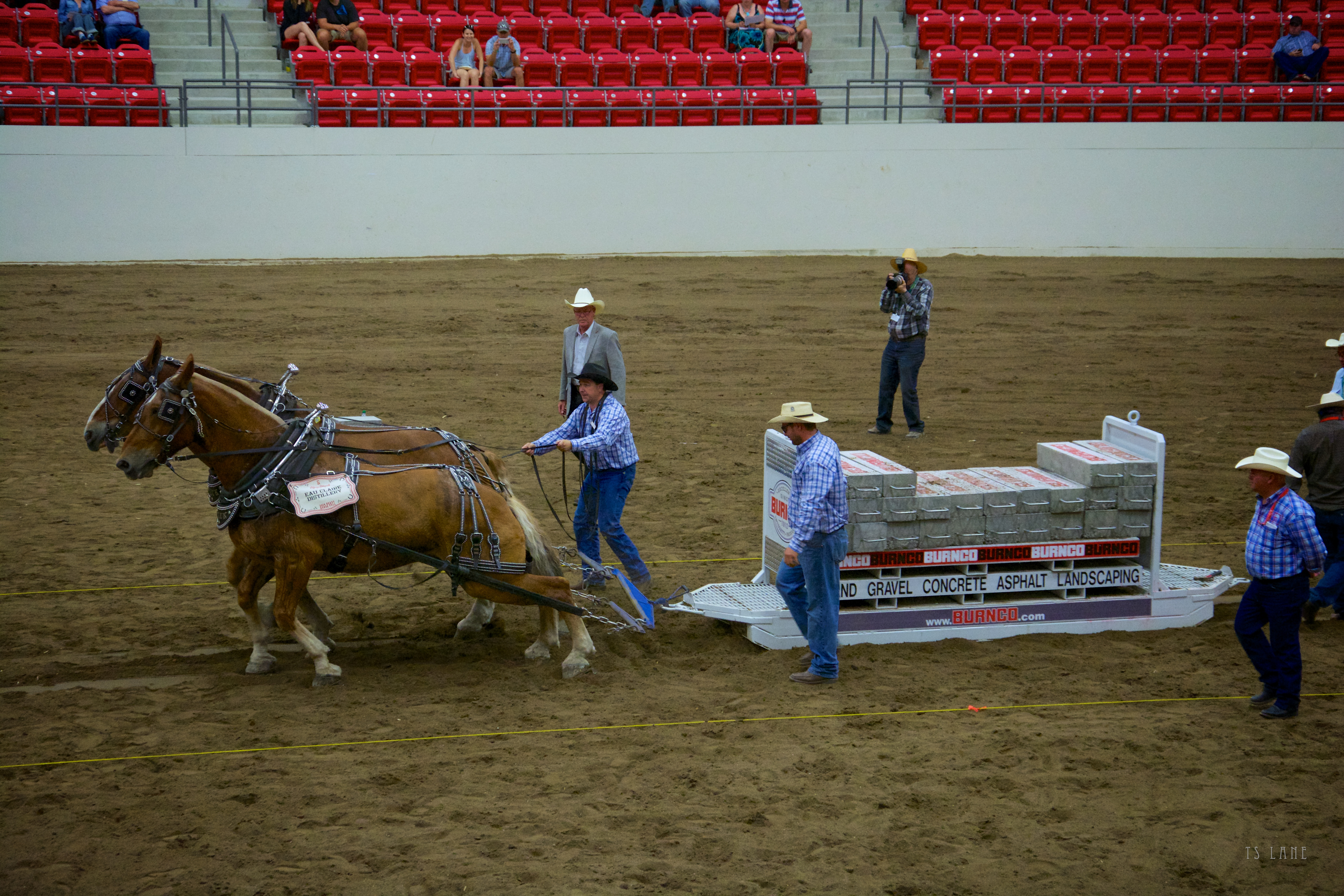
Indoor horse pull, 2014

Horse pulling is a North American draft horse competition where horses in harness, usually two animals, pull a stone-boat or weighted sled and the winner is the team or animal that can pull the most weight for a short distance. There are different weight classes and strict rules to avoid animal cruelty. Draft breeds are commonly used, but there are also competitions for ponies pulling weights relative to their size and for shorter distances than draft horses.

== Competitions ==
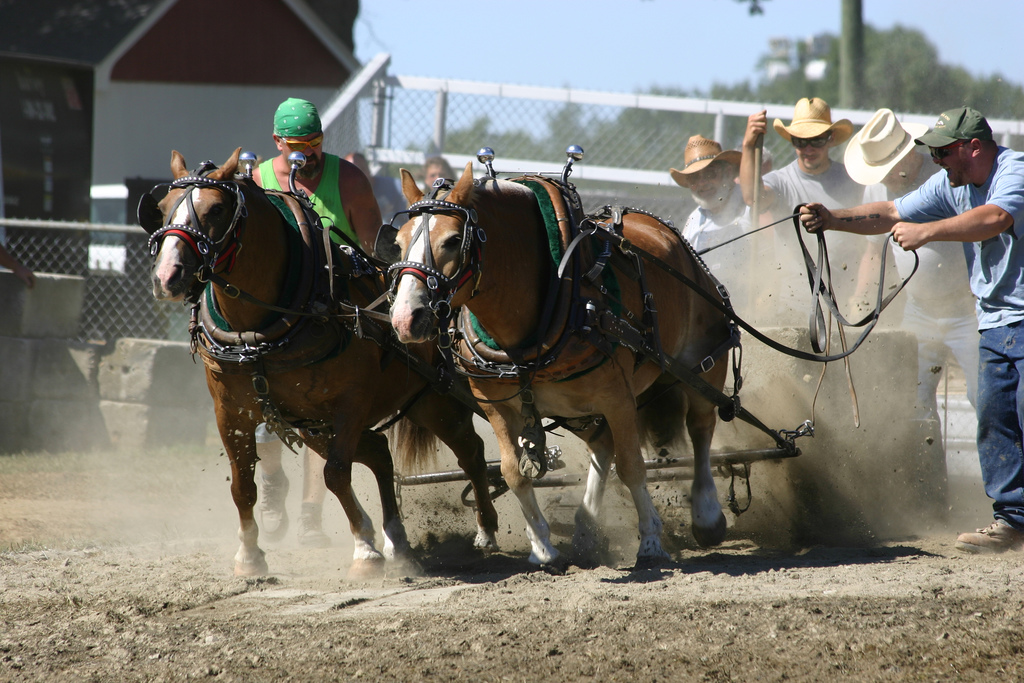
A team of horses pulling a weighted load at a horse pulling event

The sport of horse pulling originated when horses were still used for daily farm work. Farmers would challenge one another to see whose horse or team could pull the most weight. Since then, horse pulling has evolved into an organized sport with teams of equine athletes. Horses that are used for horse pulling are generally not used for work on the farm. Instead, they are worked regularly to keep their muscles and tendons strong and limber to prevent them from being hurt during competitions.

A starting load of 1500 pounds is set into the dynamometer or loaded onto a stone-boat, a weight that most teams are expected to be able to pull. Each team entered in the competition is hitched to the machine and they would pull it for a short distance. If the team can not pull the weight, they are removed from the competition and those that successfully pulled the weight continue on to the next round. The competition continues on in this way until only one team of horses remains.

Rules and regulations are in place to protect the safety of the horses during competitions. The Eastern Draft Horse Association, being the largest horse pulling organization in the United States, works to ensure safety during competitions by enforcing rules and regulations. Each competition has its own rules in addition to the Eastern Draft Horse Associations rules.

== Dynamometer ==
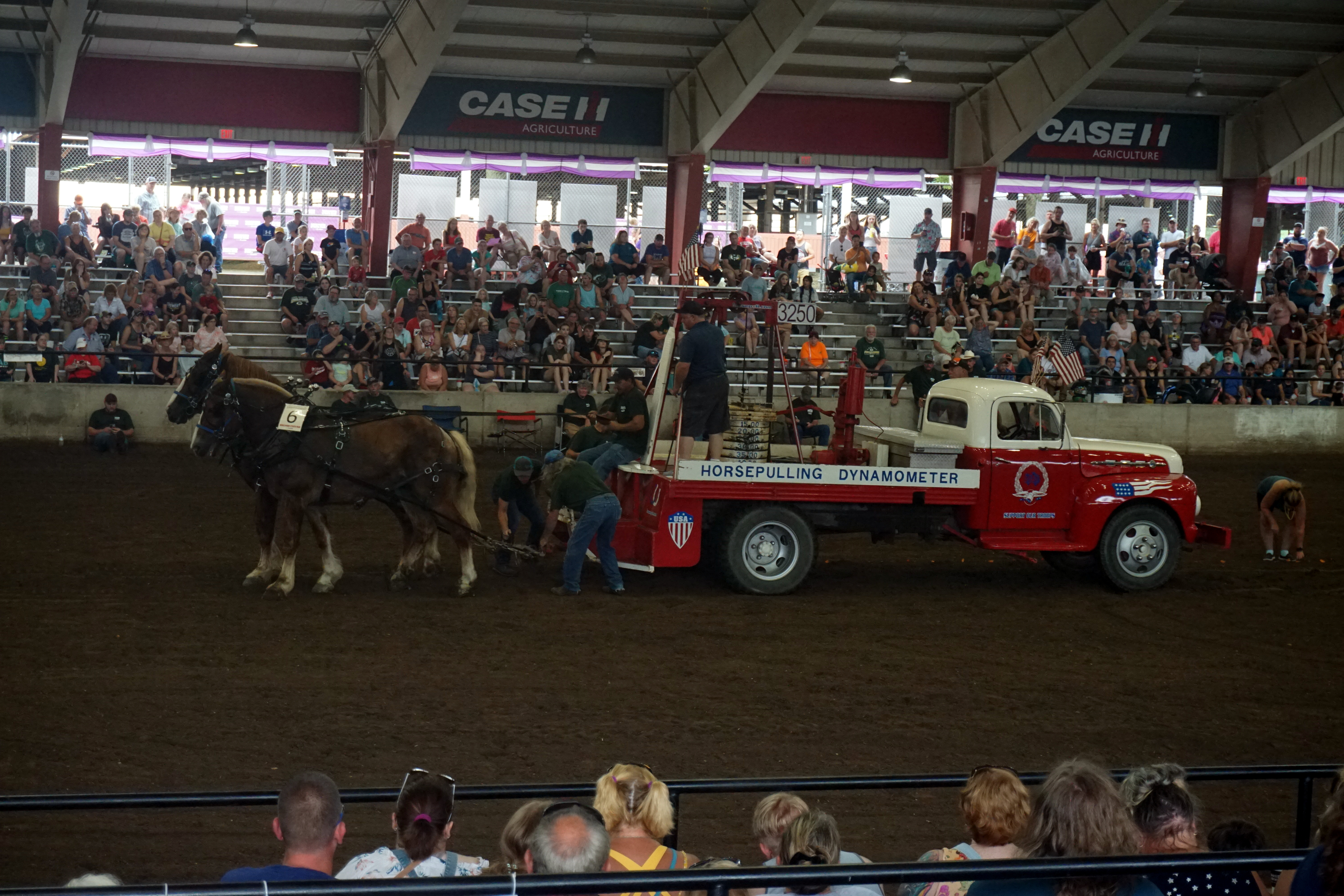
Horse pull with dynamometer (2022)

The horse-pulling dynamometer was invented after World War I when farmers were using draft horses as the main power when tending their farms. Iowa State College professor E. V. Collins worked between the years of 1923–1926 to find a way to test the efficiency of plowing horses. He built several machines that were designed to test the pulling power of horses in different soil conditions. The machine, called the dynamometer, was created to test the maximum pulling power of teams of horses. Arrangements were made for horse pulling competitions to be held at fairs and horse shows. The dynamometer has changeable weights that are set on a vertical track. A team of horses is hooked to the machine, they pull, and the weights move according to the strength of the team. There are several types of dynamometers including the Hensley-Humbert, Lance Machine, Midwest, New York, Reed, Smith, and Tostenson.

== Other countries ==
Horse pulling traditions exist in many countries, usually as cultural sports rather than standardized weight-pull competitions. Rather than using dynamometers, these events use logs, sledges or carts. They occur predominantly as part of cultural demonstrations at festivals and agricultural shows, and may include log-pulling or farm-work reenactments. In the Valencian and Catalan regions of Spain, horse pulling is called tir i arrossegament.

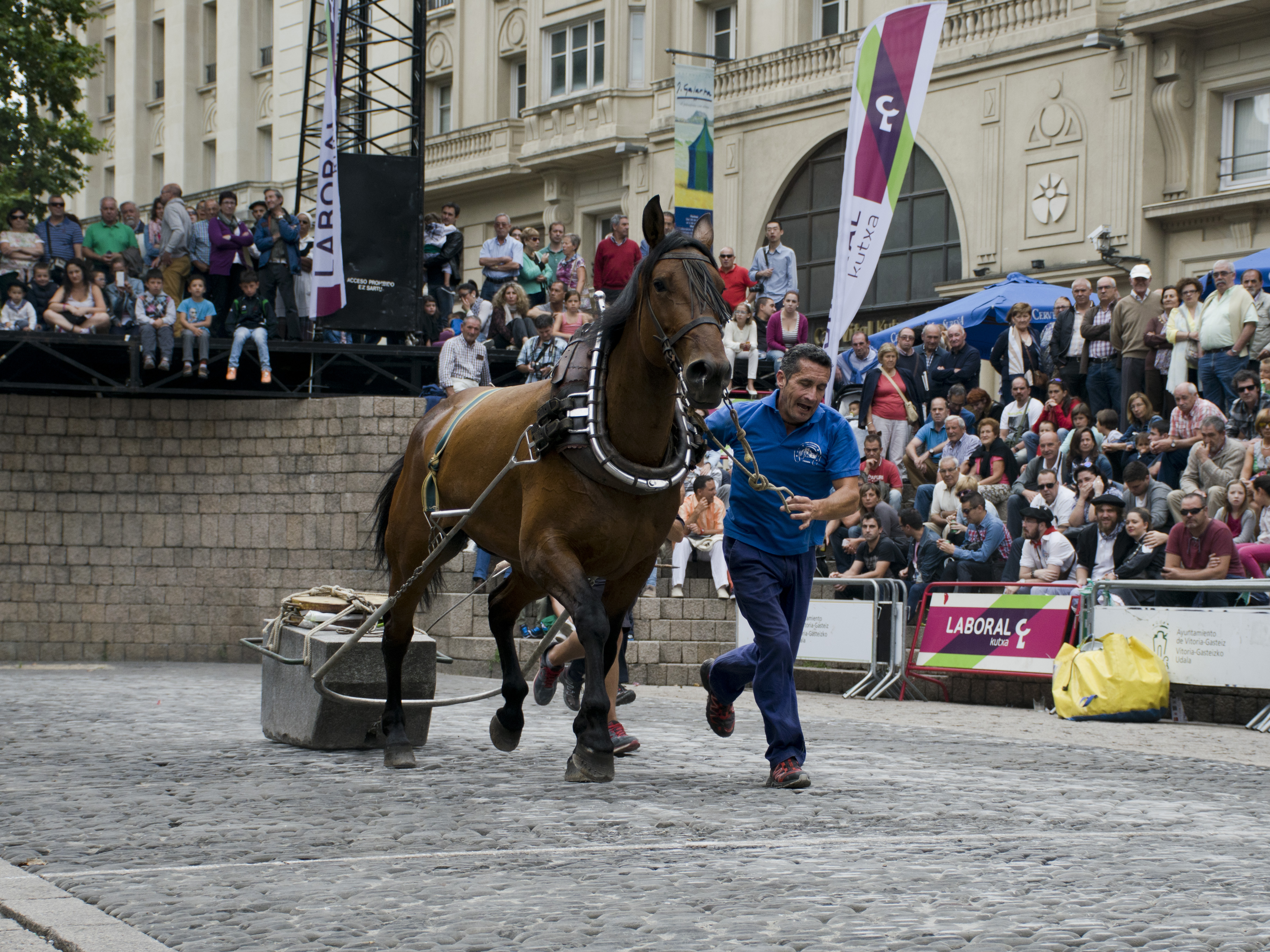
Spain

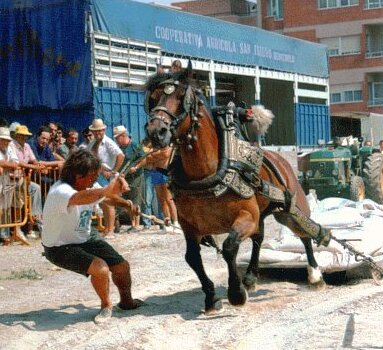
Valencia

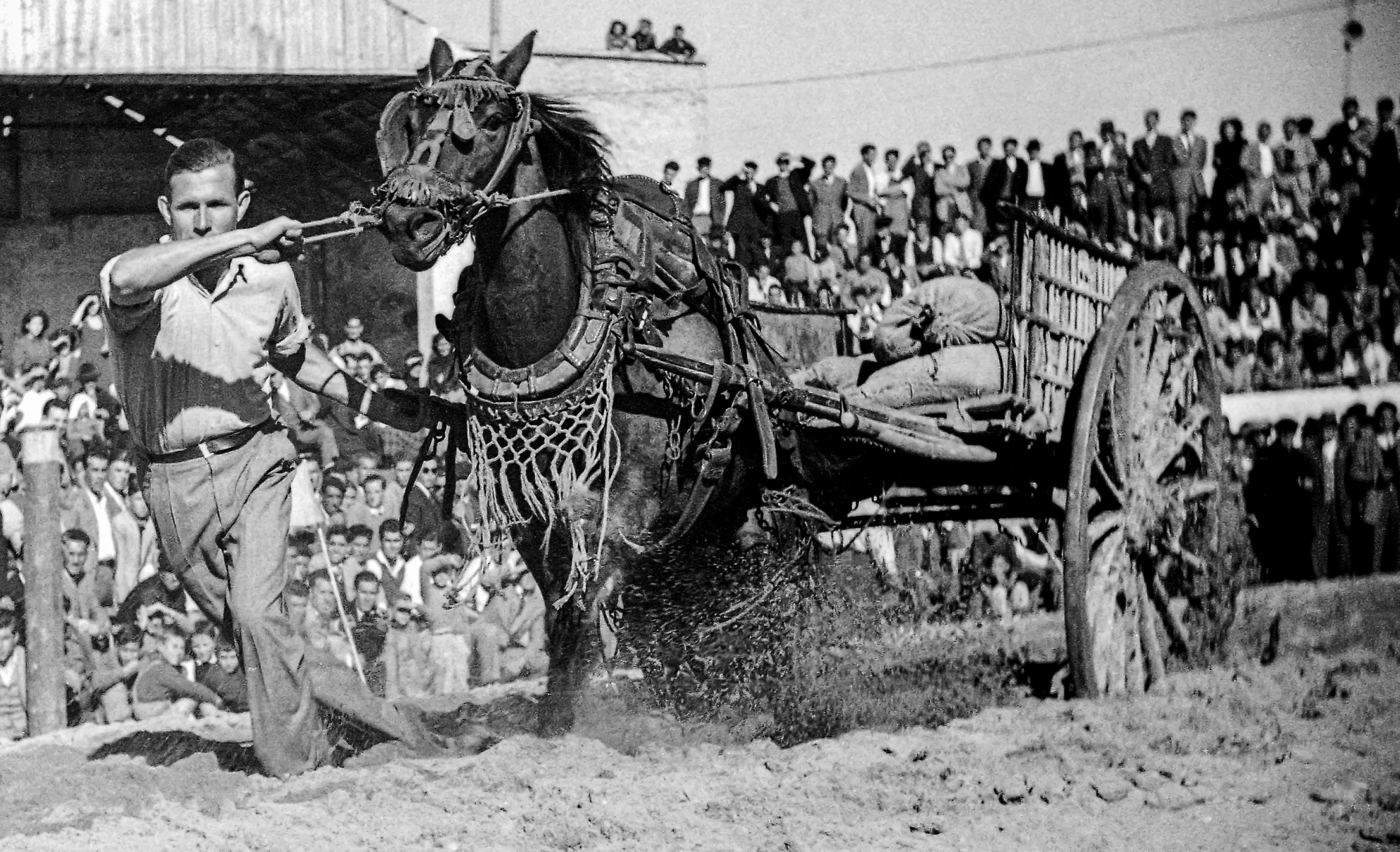
Valencia

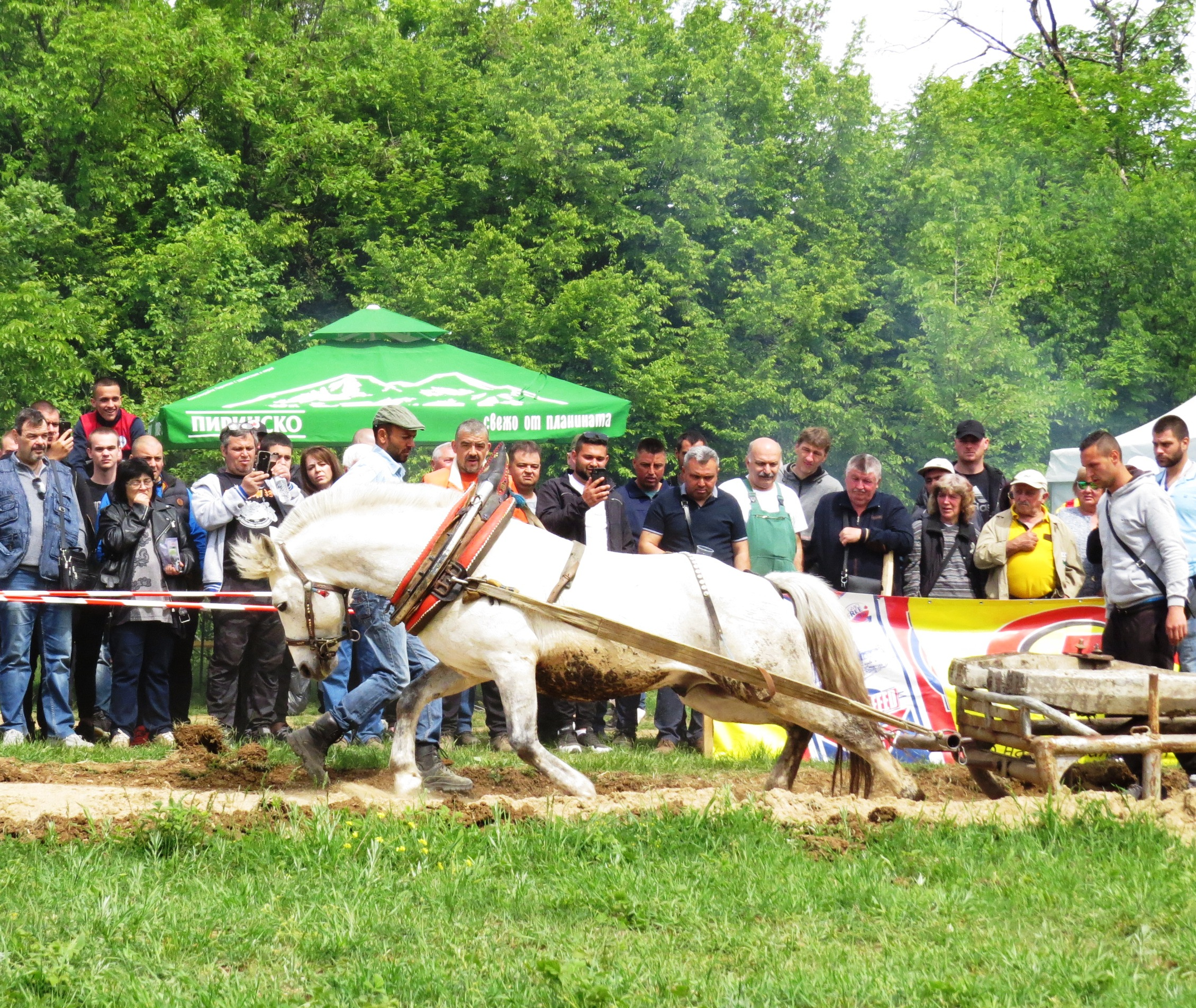
Bulgaria

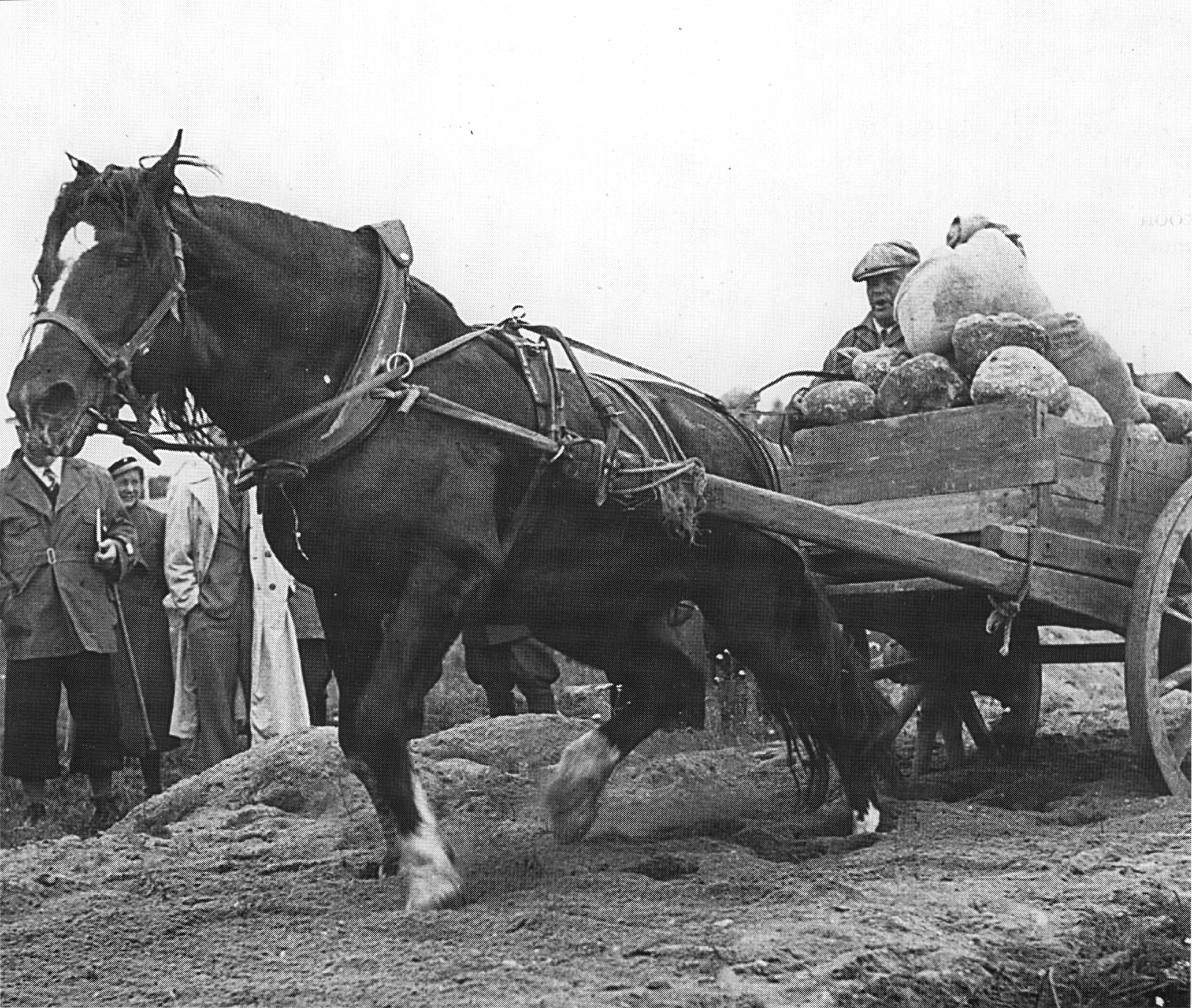
Finland

== See also ==
- Ban'ei – Japanese draft horse pulling races
- Weight pulling – Dog sport
- Tractor pulling – Motorsport competition form
