= Vozok =

Type of Russian closed winter sled

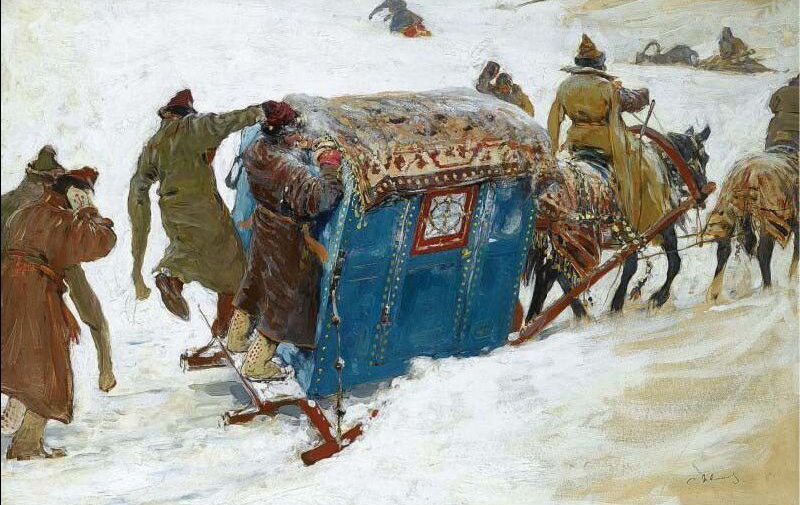
A 17th-century boyar vozok

Vozok (возок) is a type of closed winter sled that was used throughout Russia until the late 19th century. With the aim of reducing heat loss, the vozok usually had very small windows and sometimes a furnace to keep it warm. Inside it was quite dark.

Vozoks provided a high-speed means of transport through the snow-covered plains of European Russia and Siberia. It was a means of transport preferred by royals, bishops, and boyars of Muscovy. One patriarch is known to have used covered sleds even in summertime.

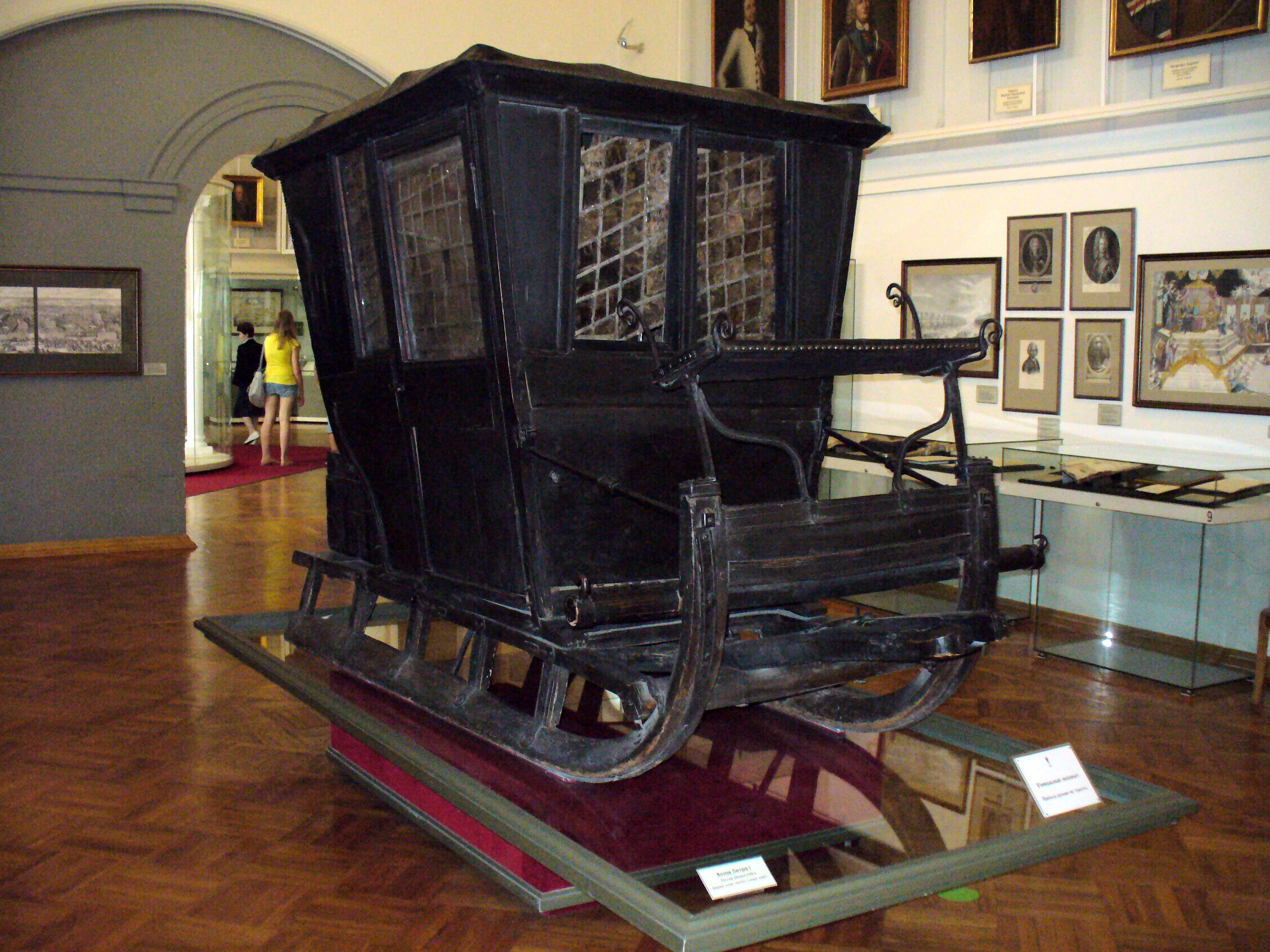
The vozok of Peter the Great

A miniature vozok of Tsarevich Peter and several other royal sleds of historical importance have been preserved in the Kremlin Armoury.

== See also ==
- Glossary of Russian horse-drawn vehicles
