= Stone-boat =

Towed sled for hauling heavy objects

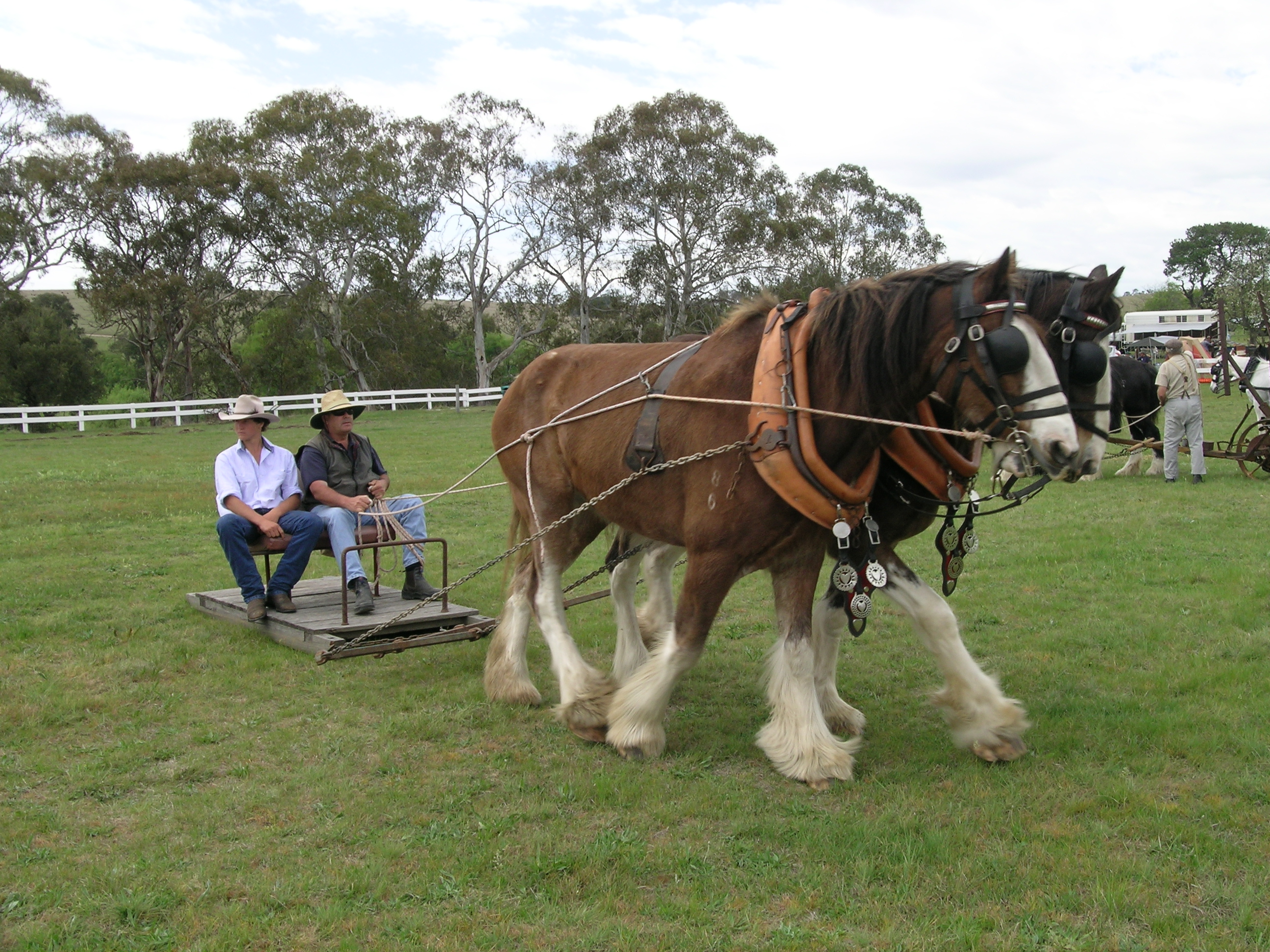
Sledge 2

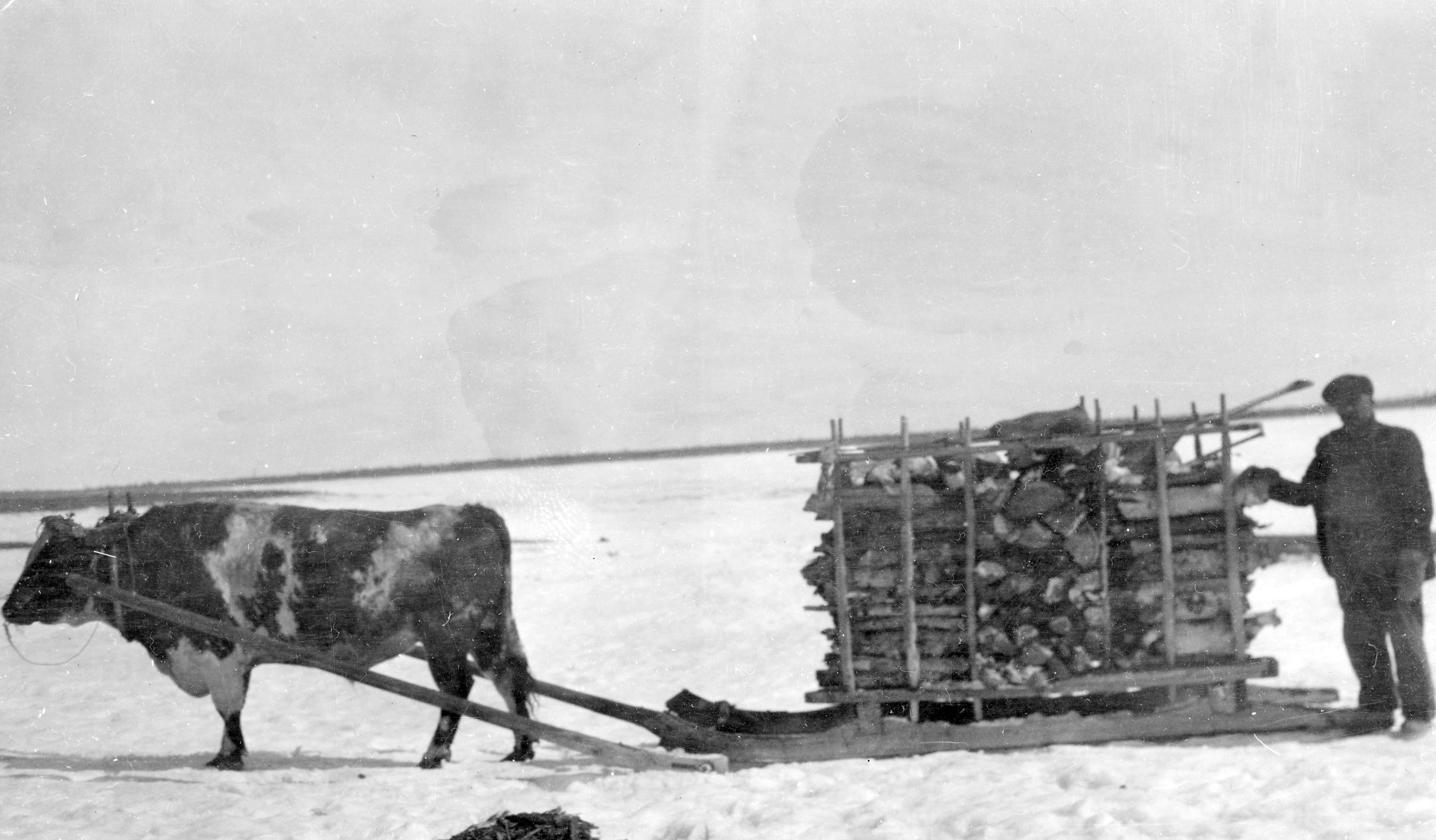
Ox-drawn sledge carrying firewood.

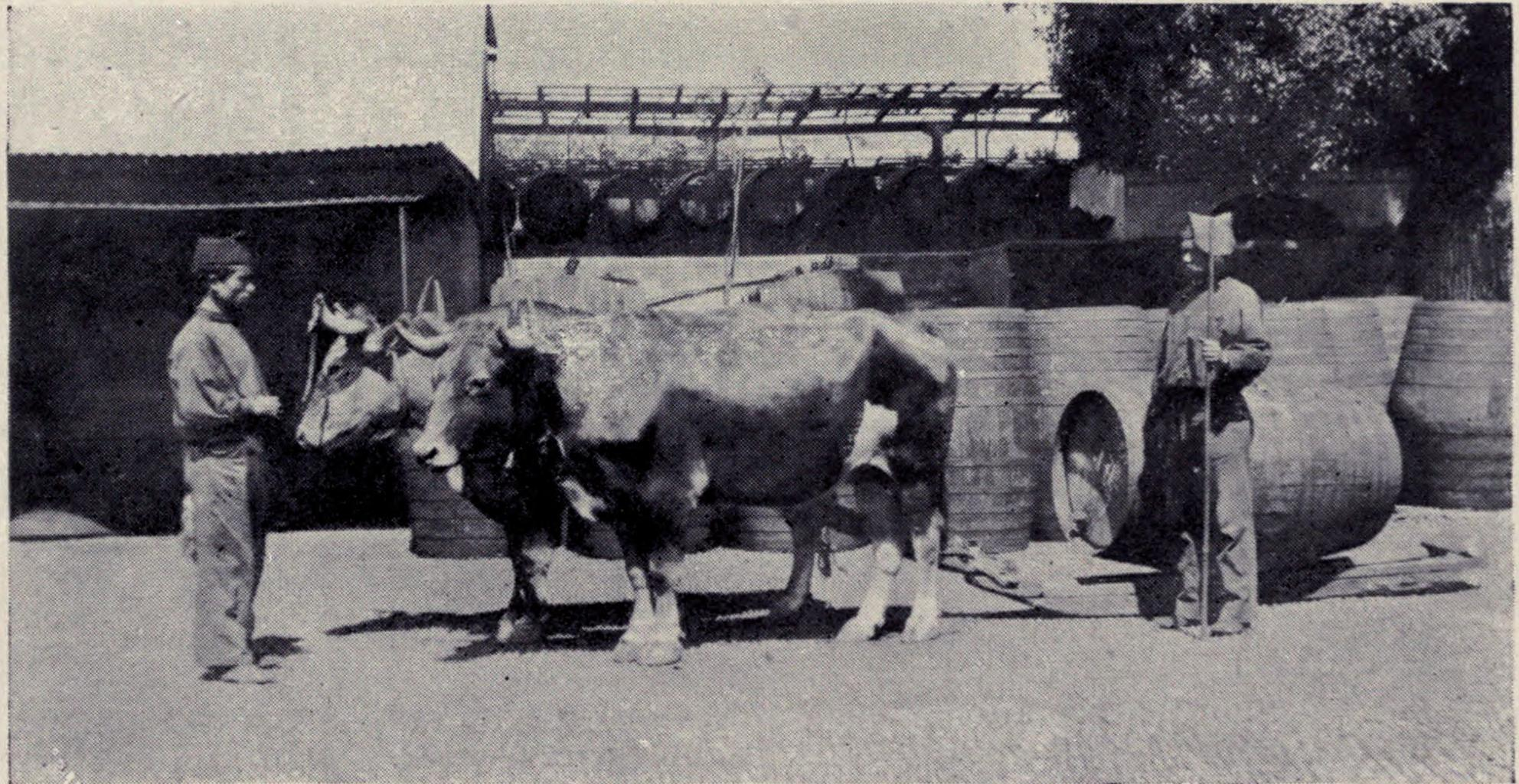
A sledge with pipe of madeira wine, MON 1909

A stone-boat is a type of sled (sledge) for moving heavy objects such as stones or hay bales. Originally they were for animal-powered transport used with horses or oxen to clear fields of stones and other uses and may still be used with animals or tractors today.

The device may look like a low-profile sled with timber runners or have a flat bottom of planks secured together to slide over soft ground or snow. Originally made of wood, metal versions exist with hinges.

== See also ==
- Cart – Wheeled vehicle for animal drawn transport
- Flatbed trolley – Form of freight transport
- Galamander
- Tumbril – Two-wheeled cart or wagon
