= Dolly =

Dolly is a synonym for a doll

Dolly may also refer to:

== Tools ==
- Dolly (tool), a portable anvil
- Dolly pot, also known as a dolly, a portable tool used for crushing small quantities of ore-bearing rock, by hand, in a process known as dollying
- A posser, also known as a dolly, used for laundering
- A variety of wheeled tools, including:
  - Dolly (trailer), for towing behind a vehicle
  - Boat dolly or launching dolly, a device for launching small boats into the water
  - Camera dolly, platform that enables a movie or video camera to move during shots
  - Hand truck, sometimes called a dolly
  - Flatbed trolley, sometimes called a dolly

== People ==
- Dolly (name), a list of people with the given name or nickname

== Arts and entertainment ==
=== Film and television ===
- Dolly shot, a type of film sequence
- Dolly (1929 film), a French silent film directed by Pierre Colombier
- Dolly (2025 film), an American horror film
- Dolly (1976 TV series), a television show starring Dolly Parton
- Dolly (1987 TV series), a television show starring Dolly Parton

=== Music ===
- Dolly (French band)
- Dolly (Japanese band)
- Dolly (Fauré), a collection of duet pieces for piano by Gabriel Fauré
- Dolly (album), a 1975 album by Dolly Parton
- Dolly (song), a song by rapper Lil Tecca feat. Lil Uzi Vert

=== Print ===
- Dolly (magazine), an Australian publication
- "Dolly" (story), a 2011 short story by Elizabeth Bear
- Dolly: A Ghost Story, a novella by Susan Hill

== Other uses ==
- Tropical Storm Dolly, various storms
- Dolly (soft drink) a Brazilian soft drink company
- Dolly (sheep), the first mammal cloned from an adult somatic cell
- Dolly (company), a Brazilian company and soft drink brand
- Dolly's Cay, or Dolly's Rock, Bahamas
- Mephedrone, drug referred to in slang as "dolly" or "dollies"
- Dolly, fanclub of the Korean musical group F-ve Dolls

== See also ==
- Dolly mixture, a British confection
- Dolley, a similarly spelled given name
- Doily, an ornamental mat
- Deccani cinema or Dollywood, Deccani/Hyderabadi Urdu film industry in India
- Dollie (disambiguation)
