= Dolly (name) =

Dolly is a given name and nickname, often a diminutive of the English personal names Dorothy and Dolores. Sometimes it is given to people surnamed "Gray" (including the baseball players Dolly Gray and Willie "Dolly" Gray), owing to the music hall song "Goodbye, Dolly Gray"; this particularly commonly occurs amongst sailors.

People with the name include:

== In arts and entertainment ==
- Dolly Ahluwalia, Indian costume designer and actress
- Dolly Allen (1906–1990), English comedian, singer and performer
- Dolly Buster (born 1969), professional name of Czech-German former porn actress, filmmaker and author Nora Baumberger
- Dolly Collins (1933–1995), British musician
- Dolly Dawn (1916–2002), American singer Theresa Maria Stabile
- Dolly de Leon (born 1969), Filipino actress
- Dolly Haas (1910–1994), German-American singer and entertainer; wife of caricaturist Al Hirschfeld
- Dolly Hall (born 1960), American film producer
- Dolly Jacobs (born c. 1957), American circus aerialist
- Dolly Martin (born 1944), English pinup model and actress
- Dolly Parton (1946–2026), American country musician
- Dolly Rathebe (1928–2004), South African musician and actress
- Dolly Shepherd (1886–1983), born Elizabeth Shepherd; English parachutist and fairground entertainer
- Dolly Sohi (born 1975), Indian actress
- Dolly Wells (born 1971), English actress and writer

== Fictional characters ==
- Dolly Gallagher Levi, fictional character and the protagonist of the plays The Merchant of Yonkers and Hello Dolly
- Dolly (character), from The Story of Tracy Beaker

== In sports ==
- Basil D'Oliveira (1931–2011), English cricketer nicknamed Dolly
- Dolly Gray (baseball) (1878–1956), baseball pitcher
- Willie "Dolly" Gray (fl. 1920–1937), baseball center fielder
- Dolly King (1916–1969), American basketball player, one of a handful of African Americans to play in the National Basketball League
- Dolly Stark (1885–1924), baseball shortstop
- Dolly Stark (umpire) (1897–1968), baseball umpire
- Dolly Vanderlip (born 1937), pitcher in the All-American Girls Professional Baseball League

== Other ==
- Doyle Brunson (1933–2023), American professional poker player known as "Dolly" or "Texas Dolly"
- Dolly Dastoor (born 1969), Canadian clinical psychologist and Zoroastrian leader
- Derek Draper (born 1967), British former lobbyist, nicknamed Dolly
- Robert 'Dolly' Dunn (1941–2009), Australian paedophile
- Dolly Elizondo, American politician
- Amy "Dolly" Everett (2003–2018), Australian cyberbullying victim who took her life
- Dolly Gee (banker) (died 1966), American banker
- Dolly Henley, American politician
- Dolly Peel (1782–1857), celebrity in Victorian England; fishwife, smuggler, nurse and poet
- Dolly Pentreath (died 1777), likely the last fluent native speaker of the Cornish language prior to its revival in 1904
- Dolly Sinatra (1896–1977), mother of Frank Sinatra

== See also ==
- Nyan Gadsby-Dolly, Trinidad and Tobago politician
- Dolley, a similarly spelled given name
