= Dolly Gray =

Dolly Gray may refer to:

- Dolly Gray (baseball) (1878–1956), American baseball pitcher
- Willie Gray (nicknamed "Dolly", fl. 1920–1937), American Negro league baseball player
- Dolly Gray impostor (fl. 1923), American football player
- Goodbye, Dolly Gray, American music hall song written in the 1890s
