= Dolley =

Dolley is a surname, also used as a given name. Notable people with the name include:

== Surname ==
- Corbyn Dolley (born 1987), South African cricketer
- Denzil Dolley (born 1977), field hockey player
- Jason Dolley (born 1991), American actor
- Joseph Norman Dolley (1860–1940), bank commissioner of State of Kansas
- Josh Dolley (born 1992), South African cricketer
- Richard Dolley (1960–2021), South African cricketer, educator, cricket and hockey administrator
- Sarah Dolley (1829–1909), American physician

== Given name ==
- Dolley Madison (1768–1849), wife of the fourth President of the United States, James Madison

== See also ==
- Dolly (name), a similar-sounding name
- Dolly (disambiguation)
- Dollie (disambiguation)
