= Richard Dolley =

South African cricketer, educator, and cricket administrator (1960–2021)

Personal information
- Full name: Richard Bertram Dolley
- Born: 3 March 1960; Port Elizabeth, Eastern Cape, South Africa
- Died: 30 June 2021 (aged 61)
- Batting: Right-handed
- Bowling: Right-arm medium-fast
- Role: All-rounder
- Relatives: Josh Dolley (nephew); Gary Dolley (brother); Corbyn Dolley (son); Brad Dolley (son)

Domestic team information
- Years: Team
- 1982/83–1990/91: Eastern Province

Career statistics
Competition	First-class
Matches	36
Runs scored	1,150
Batting average	23.00
100s/50s	0/5
Top score	97*
Balls bowled	5,809
Wickets	100
Bowling average	22.55
5 wickets in innings	4
10 wickets in match	0
Best bowling	6/65
Catches/stumpings	18/–
- Source: Cricinfo, 2 July 2021

Richard Bertram Dolley (3 March 1960 – 30 June 2021) was a South African cricketer, educator, cricket and hockey administrator. He played in 36 first-class matches between 1982/83 and 1990/91 for the Eastern Province. His nephew Josh Dolley, brother Gary Dolley, sons Corbyn Dolley and Brad Dolley all have represented Eastern Province cricket team in domestic circuit.

== Career ==
Dolley made a mark in domestic competitions featuring for Eastern Province team scoring 1150 runs and taking 100 wickets in his first-class career. His cricket career ended just at a time when the unity process was negotiated and completed.

He also served as director of Eastern Province Cricket and then he also served as the chairman of Cricket Committee of Eastern Province as well as served in the Board of Eastern Province Cricket as an executive member. He later served as a deputy principal at the Westering High School in Port Elizabeth where he also coached both cricket and hockey to the students.

== Death ==
He died on 30 June 2021, at the age of 61 due to COVID-19.
