= Dollie =

Dollie can refer to:

People

- Dollie Radford (1858–1920), English poet and writer
- Dollie McLean, founder of Artists Collective, Inc.

Other uses

- Dollie Clothes an online fashion brand
- Dollie de Luxe, a Norwegian pop music duo
- The Dollies, a 5-member dance group for the Stanford Band
- Dollie & Me a brand of children's clothing
- The Adventures of Dollie, a 1908 film by D.W Griffith
- Princess Dollie Aur Uska Magic Bag, an Indian television series

== See also ==
- Dolley, a given name
- Dolly (disambiguation)
- Doily
