= Dolly (story) =

2011 short story by Elizabeth Bear

"Dolly" is a 2011 science fiction/police procedural short story by Elizabeth Bear. It was first published in Asimov's Science Fiction.

== Synopsis ==
When a billionaire is killed by his sex robot, police must determine whether the robot was a murder weapon, or the culprit.

== Reception ==
In Locus, Lois Tilton found the story "rather sad", and noted that the murder mystery "distract(ed)" from the theme of "humans forming attachments to artificial beings". Tangent Online considered it "interesting", and praised Bear for "subversion of the machine's role".

At the Los Angeles Review of Books, Paul Kincaid described it as "not a bad story (...) efficiently told, with enough detail of character and setting to reward the reader", but added that he was disappointed by what he saw as Bear's re-use of tropes first developed by Isaac Asimov in the 1940s.

Communications of the ACM included it in an article on the use of science fiction to teach computer ethics, noting in particular its relevance to deontology.

== Adaptation ==
In 2021, Apple announced that it had won the right to produce a full-length adaptation of "Dolly", which would star Florence Pugh, and have a script by Vanessa Taylor and Drew Pearce.
