= Dolly pot =

Portable tool used for crushing rock

A dolly pot, also known as a dolly, is a portable tool used for crushing small quantities of gold-bearing rock, by hand, in a process known as dollying.

In principle, a dolly pot is somewhat like a large mortar and pestle, but is always made of metal and is intended specifically to crush hard rocks like quartz. It is typically flat at the bottom, rather than rounded as in a typical mortar. The place of the pestle is taken by a long heavy steel or iron rod, at one end provided with a stamping surface.

19th-century versions were often made of cast iron. Some cast iron dolly pots were made from cast iron containers that had been used to hold mercury, which was used in the amalgam process. Modern dolly pots are typically fabricated from steel.

The process of dollying is highly labour-intensive. It involves pulverising the rock, by hand, until the gold separates from the surrounding rock matrix. It typically is used only to test for the presence of gold in samples taken from a quartz reef.

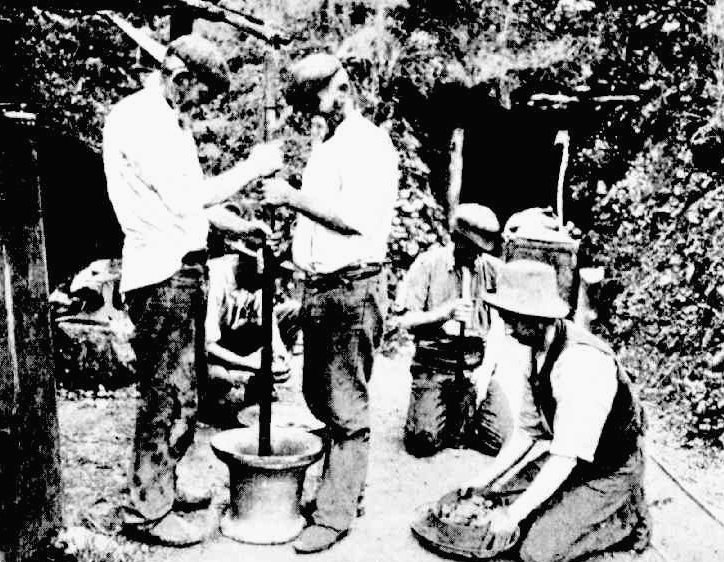
Dollying gold-bearing quartz, using a cast-iron dolly pot, Reno, New South Wales, 1911.

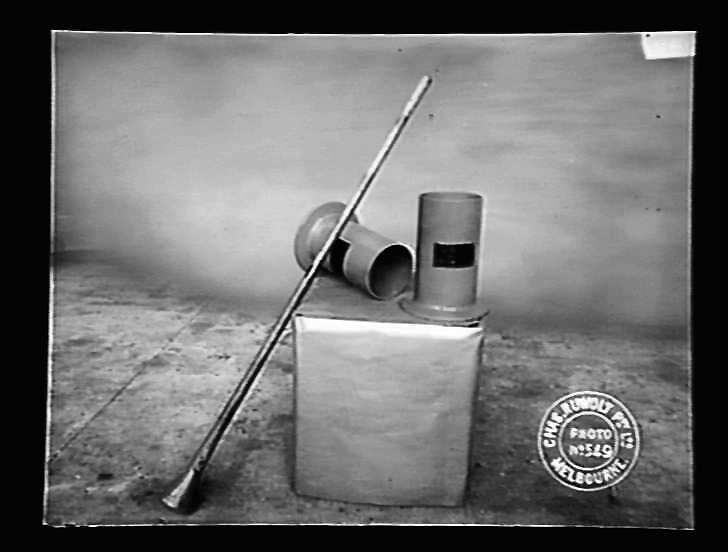
Steel dolly pots made in 1932

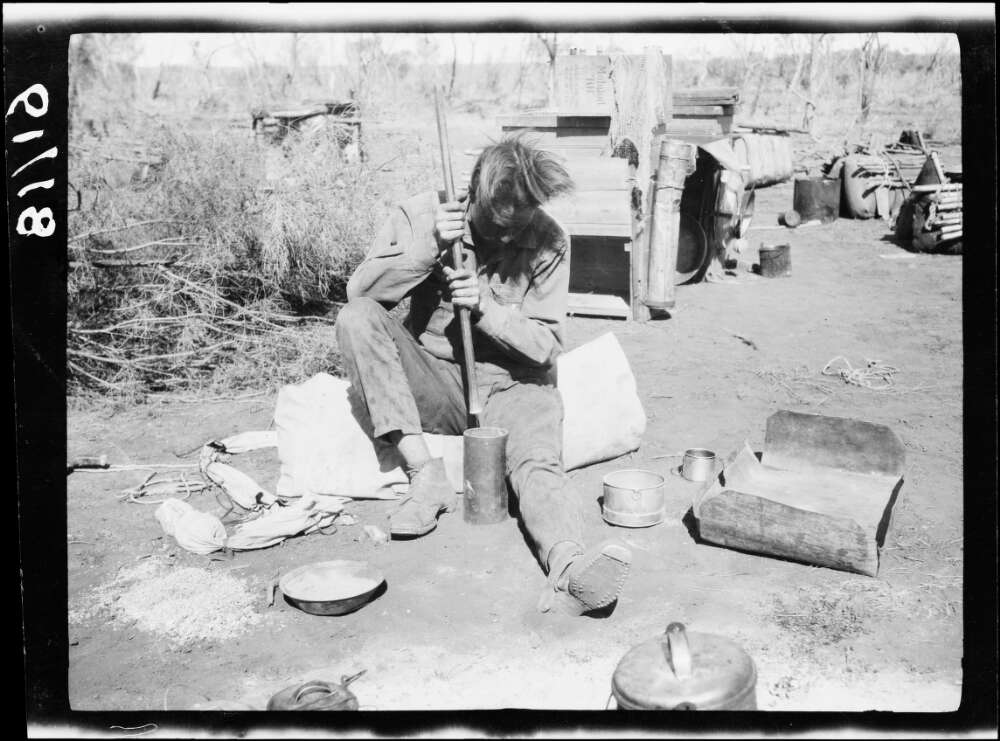
Dollying rocks, Northern Territory, 1933, using a steel dolly pot.
