= Dolly's Cay =

Rock on the Great Bahama Bank

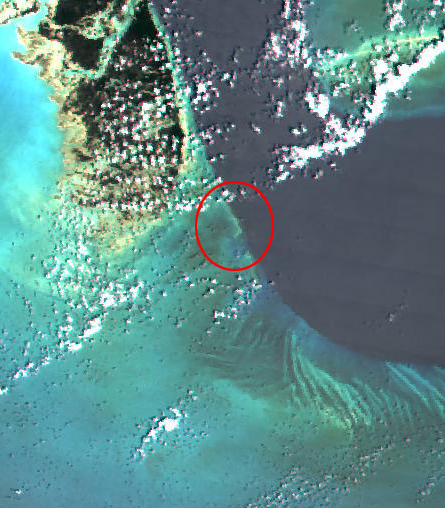
- Location of Dolly's Cay: Andros Island to the north

- Location within Bahamas

Geography
- Location: Atlantic Ocean
- Coordinates: 23.65°N 77.36°W
- Type: Cay
- Archipelago: Lucayan Archipelago

Administration
- Bahamas

Dolly's Cay (or Dolly's Rock) is a remote rock on the Great Bahama Bank in the series of cays running southeast from Andros Island, and is around 20 km (12 mi) east south east of the southeast tip of Andros. It is part of South Andros District.

The cay is used for nesting by bridled terns, sooty terns, Sandwich terns, and royal terns, which were last verified by James Parnell in 1998. These birds are monitored as part of the West Indies Seabird Geographic Information System, a database of all contributions from the Seabird Working Group of the Society for the Conservation and Study of Caribbean Birds.
