= Dolly (soft drink) =

Brazilian soft drink company

- Origin: Brazil
- Introduced: 1987
- Website: www.dolly.com.br

Dolly is a Brazilian soft drink company based in Diadema, São Paulo which has operated in the Southeast Region of Brazil since its founding in 1987. Its main product is Dolly Guaraná.

Its mascot, Dollynho, has appeared in the company's advertisements since 2006. Due to its exposure on national television, Dollynho became a popular internet meme in Brazil.

== History ==
In 1987, Dolly became the first company in Brazil to sell diet soda. In 2003, the company's owner, Laerte Codonho, filed suit against Coca-Cola alleging that the company was engaging in anti-competitive practices. This case became known as the Coca-Cola v. Dolly case, which was widely publicized by RedeTV!. Since 2003, Dolly's commercials have aired on most major Brazilian television stations, except TV Globo. Dolly established a working relationship with RedeTV! and was a sponsor of several of its programs, airing commercials on the former Pânico na TV program and on afternoon comedy shows presented by João Kléber. added Grape flavor, Citrus flavor and Passionfruit flavor. In 2006, the character Dollynho was created.

In 2015, data from the Nielsen Corporation found that Dolly had a 10% share in Brazil's soft drink market, though its products were distributed primarily in the Southeast Region. In Greater São Paulo, Dolly products accounted for 30% of the soft drink sales.

In 2017, an investigation known as Operação Clone (Operation Clone) conducted by the Federal Police of Brazil and the São Paulo State Finance Department found that the company owed upwards of two billion reals in taxes, which the company alleged were stolen from it by a fraudulent accounting firm hired to pay its taxes. During the police operation, some of the company's factories were closed for several days. Laerte Codonho was arrested by the military police at his home in Granja Viana on 10 May 2018, charged with tax fraud.

== Dollynho ==
The company's mascot is Dollynho (lit. "Little Dolly"), a green humanoid bottle of Dolly soda, voiced by child actor Felipe Machado. The first Dollynho advertisements were inspired by the Teletubbies and were filmed at the company owner's home as the company lacked the funds needed to hire a production team. Behind the creation of the character, Laerte Codonho said:

I thought I needed a character for Dolly. Everyone was paying to have a Disney character. I said: 'I'm not going to pay anyone. I'm going to make my own character. And, at the time, I watched Teletubbies often with my daughter, that I started to enjoy the repetition. There comes a time when you miss it when you don't see Tinky Winky.

The soft drink commercials involving the character became very well-known due to their high repetition during commercial breaks on TV channels such as SBT and RedeTV! (especially the latter, which had a strong sponsorship link with Dolly) with musical commercials, including some themed around holidays such as Christmas and Easter, being repeated for several years. The character's slogan is "Dollynho – o seu amiguinho" (Dollynho – your little friend). The mascot has visited schools in Brazil and performed recreational activities with students.

Dollynho is a popular internet meme in Brazil, with edits of the character being common on Facebook and other sites, usually making fun of the character because of his weird and overly childish appearance or the low production budgets of the commercials, at the point where the character has already even been comically demonized. The arrest of the company's owner led to many internet users creating memes featuring Dollynho, with some depicting the mascot behind bars or including fake protest signs that read "Free Dollynho!" and others depicting the mascot as a thief. RedeTV! received criticisms for its use of the character in its news graphics after a notable gaffe in which a smiling Dollynho appeared on screen and cheerfully said "goodbye!" while reporting on the death of Olavo de Carvalho.

The character's popularity in memes has also caused other characters similar to him, food mascots, to go viral on the internet. The most notorious case was the character Barriguinha Mole (whose name means Soft Little Belly in Portuguese) from the local company Laticínios Acrelândia in the state of Acre, who appeared only once in a low-budget commercial in the 2000s, being an anthropomorphic milk bag that was often compared to Dollynho portraying them as rivals or even as a couple.
