= Dolly Gee (banker) =

Chinese-American banker

Dolly Gee was a Chinese-American banker. She was the manager of San Francisco's Chinatown branch of the Bank of America for 34 years and is considered the first woman bank manager in America.

== Biography ==
Gee was born in China and came to the United States as an infant in 1901.

When Gee was 15 or 16 years old, her father, Charles F. Gee, was looking for a young person to work with the French American Bank to develop its business in San Francisco's Chinatown. Gee persuaded her father to introduce her to the hiring manager and she was given the opportunity. She successfully signed up new customers for the bank and when the bank opened a branch in Chinatown in 1923, Gee became manager. In 1929 the bank merged with the Bank of America and the branch moved location, however Gee remained as branch manager. Under Gee's management the branch grew to be the 60th most profitable of the bank's 800 branches, and deposits increased from $2 million to $20 million.

In November 1962, as she was preparing to retire the following year, Gee informed the president of the Bank of America that she had been taking funds from customers' accounts; she was arrested on 24 December and charged with embezzlement. Gee told newspaper reporters that the embezzlement had begun many years prior. She stated that her father had been an officer in a Chinese bank which had closed, and the deposits of his customers had been lost. He had covered the losses by moving funds between accounts, and when he had informed her of this in 1930 she had decided to assist him. She pleaded guilty at the trial and served 16 months in jail at Federal Correctional Institution, Terminal Island. She was released in 1965 and returned to Chinatown. She died in early 1966.
