= Corbyn Dolley =

South African cricketer (born 1987)

Personal information
- Born: 26 November 1987 (age 38); Port Elizabeth, South Africa
- Source: Cricinfo, 17 December 2020

Corbyn Dolley (born 26 November 1987) is a South African cricketer. He played in 42 first-class, 46 List A, and 20 Twenty20 matches from 2007 to 2015.
