= Dolly Gray (baseball) =

American baseball player (1878-1956)

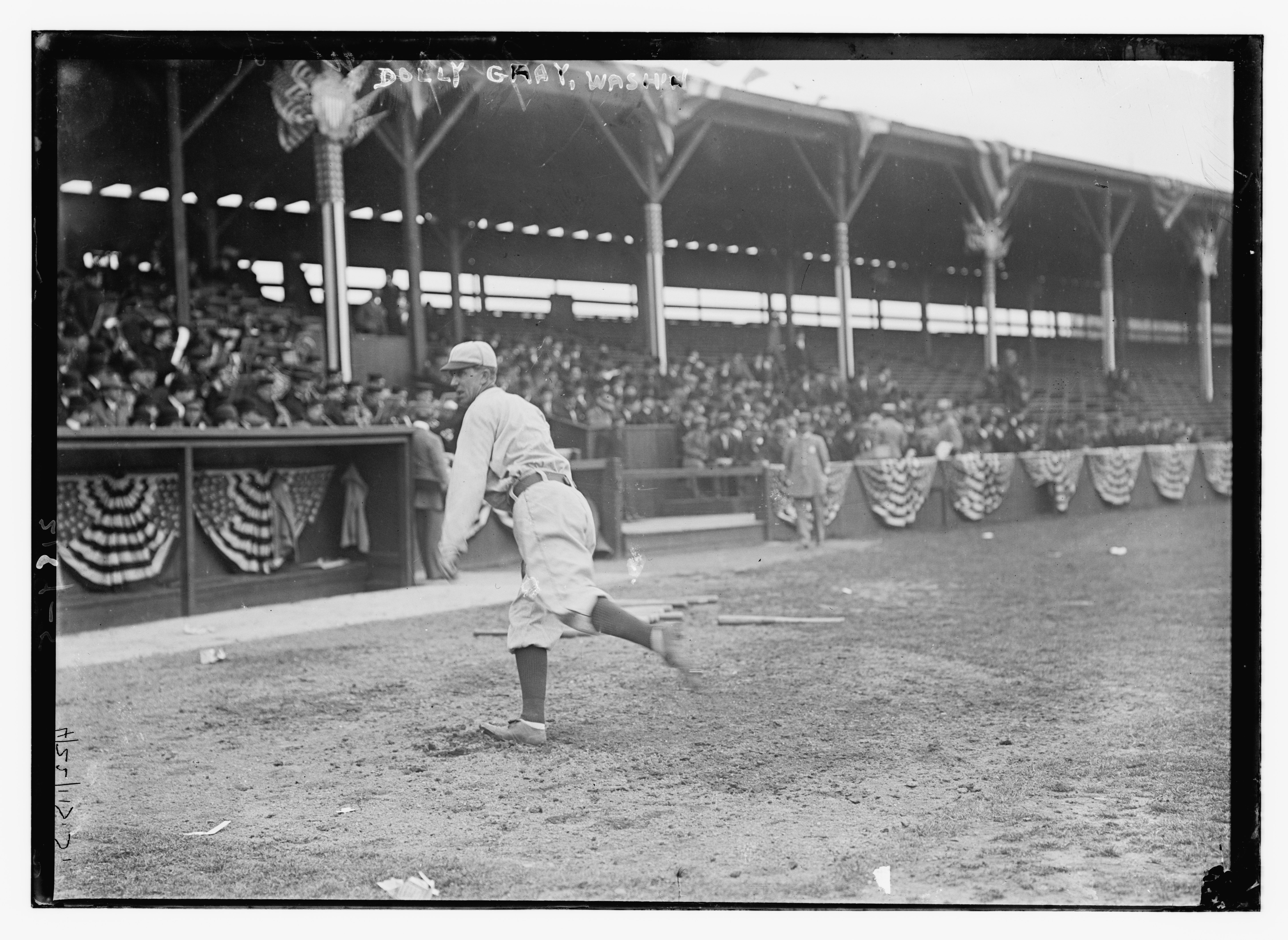
- Pitcher
- Born: December 4, 1878; Atlantic Mine, Michigan, U.S.
- Died: April 4, 1956 (aged 77); Yuba City, California, U.S.
- Batted: Left Threw: Left

MLB debut
- April 13, 1909, for the Washington Senators

Last MLB appearance
- September 29, 1911, for the Washington Senators

MLB statistics
- Earned run average: 3.52
- Win–loss record: 15-51
- Strikeouts: 213
- Stats at Baseball Reference

Teams
- Washington Senators (1909–1911)

William Denton "Dolly" Gray (December 4, 1878 – April 4, 1956) was an American left-handed professional baseball pitcher who played from 1909 to 1911 for the Washington Senators.

== Before the big leagues ==
His nickname, "Dolly", derived from the music hall song Goodbye, Dolly Gray. Gray began his professional career during or before the 1902 season. In 1902, he pitched for the Los Angeles Angels of the old California League. Following the 1902 season, the Angels joined to the Pacific Coast League, and in 1903 they had one of the greatest seasons in minor league baseball history, with 133 wins against 78 losses. Gray went 23–20 with a 3.55 ERA that season. In 1904, Gray went 24–26, in 1905, he went 30–16, in 1906, he went 7–2 (during the 1906 season, Gray and many other West Coast players left to play on the East Coast after the great 1906 San Francisco earthquake), in 1907 he went 32–14 and in 1908 he went 26–11. He played in one game in 1909, winning it. In 1905 and 1907, he led the league in winning percentage.

== Major league baseball ==
A 30-year-old rookie, Gray made his major league debut on April 13, 1909. He made 36 appearances in his rookie season, starting 26 of those games. He went 5–19 with 19 complete games. That year, he led the league in earned runs allowed (87), was third in losses, seventh in walks allowed (77) and eighth in appearances. On August 28 of that year, he set the major league record for most walks allowed in an inning, when he walked eight batters in the second inning. He also set the record for most consecutive walks in an inning, when he walked seven batters in a row. In total, Gray allowed 11 walks that game, giving up six runs and earning the loss in the process. Had he had better control, he may very well have won the game – he threw a one-hitter.

In 1910, Gray went 8–19 with a 2.63 ERA. He was second in the league in losses that year, fifth in wild pitches (9), ninth in earned runs allowed (67) and ninth in hit batsmen (10).

On April 12, 1911, Gray threw the very first pitch in Griffith Stadium history. He also won the game that day, beating opposing pitcher Smoky Joe Wood. That would be one of only two wins for Gray in 1912 – overall that season, he went 2–13 with a 5.06 ERA. His ten wild pitches that season were fourth most in the league, and his ten games finished were eighth most in the league. Gray played in his final major league game on September 29, 1911.

Gray went 15–51 with a 3.52 ERA in his three-year career. His .227 winning percentage is one of the worst all-time among pitchers with at least 50 career decisions. As a batter, Gray hit .202 in 218 big league at bats.

== Post-big league career ==
Following his major league career, Gray pitched in the Pacific Coast league from 1912 to 1913, retiring after the 1913 season. He played for the Vernon Tigers and Oakland Oaks in that time.

Following his death, he was buried in Sutter Cemetery in Sutter, California.

In 2008, Gray was inducted into the Pacific Coast League Hall of Fame, along with Wheezer Dell, Casey Stengel and Lee Susman.
