= Willie Gray =

American baseball player

- Center fielder / First baseman
- Born: Unknown; Unknown
- Died: Unknown; Unknown
- Batted: Left Threw: Left

Negro league baseball debut
- 1920, for the Dayton Marcos

Last appearance
- 1937, for the Brooklyn Royal Giants
- Stats at Baseball Reference

Teams
- Dayton Marcos (1920); Pittsburgh Keystones (1921-1922); Cleveland Tate Stars (1922-1923); Homestead Grays (1924-1927); Lincoln Giants (1928-1929); Newark Browns (1932); Brooklyn Royal Giants (1935-1937)

William "Dolly" Gray was an American professional baseball center fielder and first baseman in the Negro leagues. He played from 1920 to 1937, spending time with several clubs.
