= Austin E. and Alta S. Fife =

American folklorists

Austin Edwin Fife (December 18, 1909 – February 7, 1986) and Alta Stevens Fife (March 16, 1912 – December 8, 1996), were a married couple of Folklorists from Utah who studied and preservation of American Western and Mormon folklore. Their work is commemorated through the Fife Folklore Archives, the Fife Folklore Conference, and the Fife Honor Lecture at Utah State University (USU).

The Fifes were involved in the study of folkloristics in Utah. They met at Utah State University and began folklore research together in the late 1930s while living in California. There, Austin was a graduate student at Stanford University and served as a research assistant to Aurelio Espinosa, Sr., a professor of Hispanic-American folklore.

In 1960, the Fifes settled in Logan, Utah. Austin began teaching French and Folklore at USU. The Fifes donated their collection of folklore research to USU’s Merrill-Cazier Library in 1966. This collection was later renamed the Fife Folklore Archives and has been described as “one of a number of leading research facilities that acquire, preserve and make available the materials in folklore fields”.

William A. Wilson continued Austin Fife's work by joining the faculty at USU. Wilson also established the Fife Honor Lecture to pay tribute to folklorists. Later, the lectures were directed by Barre Toelken and "extended to include anyone who was doing interesting work in folklore or folklore-related fields”.

== Publications ==
“Saints of Sage and Saddle by the Fifes is considered a comprehensive treatment of Mormon folklore”.

== See also ==
- Three Nephites
