= Mormon folklore =

Folklore surrounding Mormon tradition

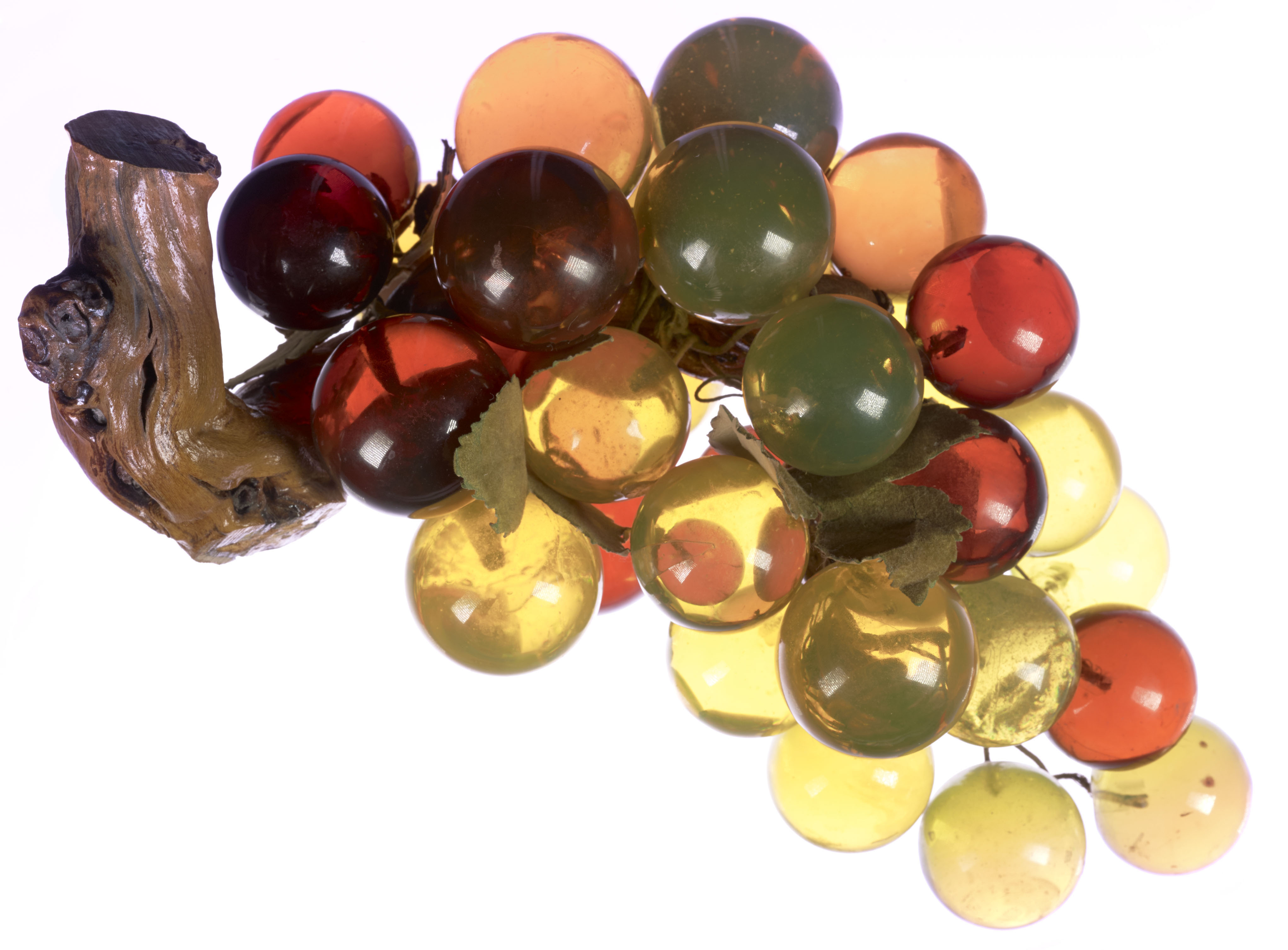
Resin grapes, a popular Relief Society craft in the 1960s

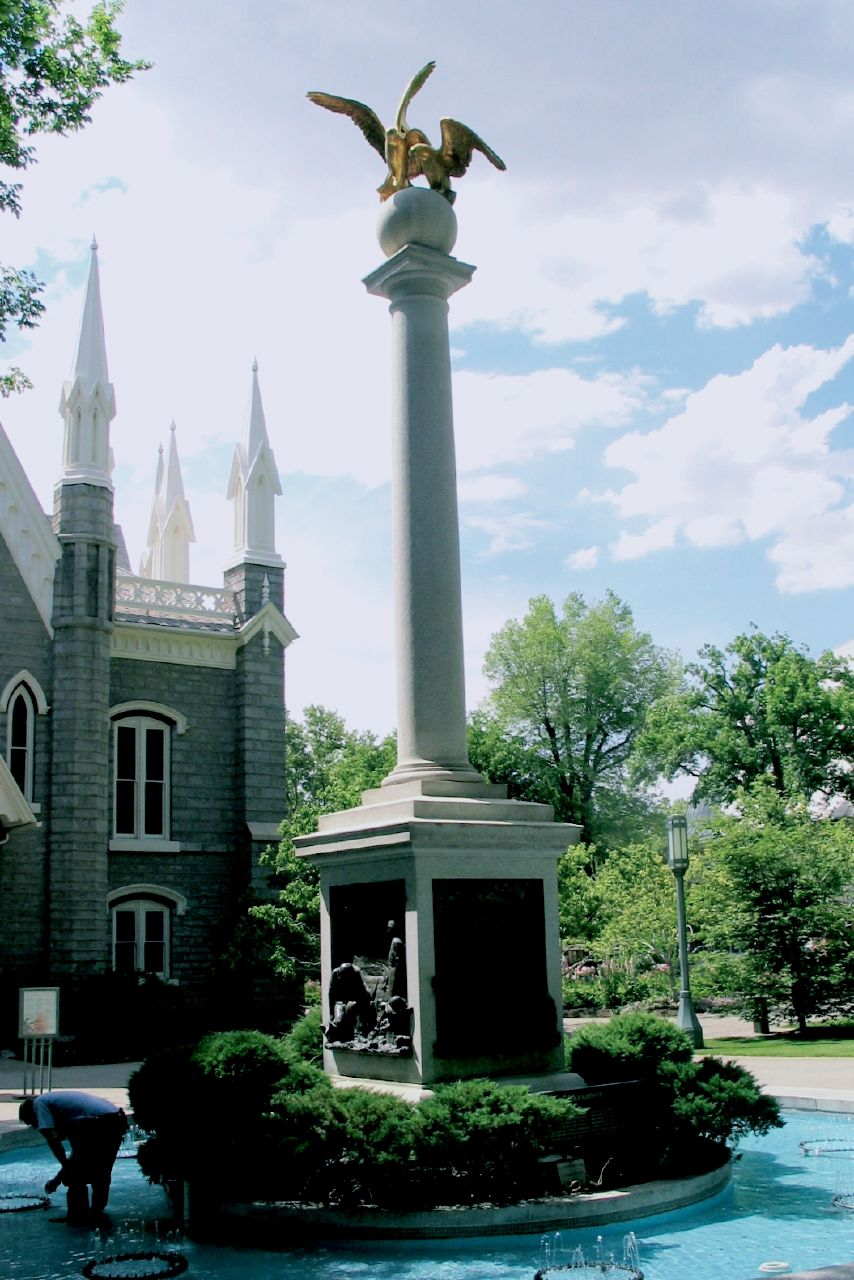
The Seagull Monument located in front of the Salt Lake Assembly Hall on Temple Square.

Mormon folklore is a body of expressive culture unique to members of the Church of Jesus Christ of Latter-day Saints (LDS Church) and other sects of Mormonism. Mormon folklore includes tales, oral history, popular beliefs, customs, music, jokes, and material culture traditions. In folklore studies, Mormons can be seen as a regional group, since the core group of Mormon settlers in Utah had a common religion and had to modify their surroundings for survival. This historical regional area includes Utah, Southeastern Idaho, parts of Wyoming and eastern Nevada, and a few towns in eastern Arizona, southern Alberta, northwestern New Mexico, southern Colorado, and northern Chihuahua, Mexico.

Verbal lore for Mormons includes stories that missionaries tell each other to encourage adherence to mission rules. Members tell stories about Mormon pioneers, The Three Nephites, and unseen benevolent spirits to bolster their faith. In pioneer times, folk songs alternately praised and punished prominent leaders like Brigham Young.

Common customs for Mormons include reciting conversion narratives, which is especially common during fast and testimony meeting. Married members also commonly tell how they were inspired to choose their spouse, and some women with children recount that a vision of a future child inspired them to have more children. In the Mormon regional area, creative date invitations are a common way for teenagers to ask each other out. Pioneer Day is a state holiday in Utah, where members patriotically celebrate their religious predecessors.

Pioneer handicrafts were inspired by the many cultures that came together in Utah. Handicrafts were initially a necessity, and pioneers developed techniques to adapt their skills to the materials on hand. Later, the Relief Society promoted handicrafts as improving mental health. Along with quilting and needlework, pioneers also made hair jewelry, human hair wreaths, and silk thread. Towns in the Mormon regional area have a unique combination of features, including unpainted barns, irrigation ditches, wooden moveable hay derricks, and Lombardy poplars as wind breaks. Tombstones in this area commonly depict clasped hands or a Mormon temple. Mormon fundamentalists have different folklore from Latter-day Saints. They draw on their shared heritage of experience in government raids to unify them, and enjoy folk dancing.

== Research into Mormon folklore ==
Alta S. and Austin E. Fife are the founders of research into Mormon folklore, a discipline that has expanded greatly since the couple's initial work in the 1930s. Although previous and contemporary scholars had briefly addressed the issue, the Fifes expanded the field, both through their collection, now known as the Fife Folklore Archive, held at the Merrill-Cazier Library on the Utah State University campus in Logan, Utah. Their book on Mormon folklore, Saints of Sage and Saddle, was published in 1956. This book, according to folklorist Jill Terry Rudy, "remains the most complete book-length treatment of Mormon folklore". Folklorist William A. Wilson also specialized in Mormon folklore, and helped establish the way Mormon folklore is organized in archives.

== Verbal lore ==
=== Missionary lore ===
Missionaries have their own set of folklore. According to folklorist William A. Wilson, missionaries tell stories for four main purposes: to build a sense of comradeship, to cope with the pressures of missionary life, to encourage missionaries to keep mission rules, and to assure themselves of future victory.

They commonly tell stories about how new missionaries, or "greenies", are initiated into the existing missionary group through pranks, even if these pranks never occurred. Learning missionary slang also helps new missionaries feel like part of the missionary community. Missionaries often tell stories in which some missionaries try to escape mission life but are discovered. One common "unauthorized trip story" tells how two missionaries write their weekly reports in advance, entrust them to their landlady, and embark on a sightseeing tour, only to be caught when their landlady sends the reports all at once. Another common story tells of a missionary who decides to break mission rules and participate in a sports tournament, only to be discovered by their mission president when their picture appears in the news. These stories focus on trickster heroes who fail and embody the group's childish fantasies, acting as "an approved steam-valve for the group". In some stories that encourage obedience, a missionary disobeys the rules and suffers disastrous consequences. Other stories tell of missionaries miraculously saved from danger. Missionaries also tell stories about getting the best of a hostile world, even if it causes other people to suffer. Missionaries in such stories shake the dust from their feet after leaving a city that was unresponsive to their message. After performing this ritual, the city is destroyed through a natural disaster, war, or economic depression. Stories where people insult missionaries, only to come to an untimely end, are common.

=== On scriptural themes ===
Mormon folk beliefs on scriptural topics include:

- that Cain, the killer of Abel, is still alive and wanders the earth as punishment for killing Abel, wearing no clothing but being covered by hair, and that apostle David W. Patten encountered him once, and that reported sightings of Bigfoot can be explained by this story
- that Jesus was born on 6 April which was later the date that Joseph Smith founded the Church of Christ (the predecessor of the modern LDS Church) in 1830
- modern encounters and assistance from one or more of "The Three Nephites", three Nephite disciples chosen by Jesus in the Book of Mormon, who were blessed by Jesus to "never taste of death; but ye shall live to behold all the doings of the Father unto the children of men".

=== Folk narratives ===
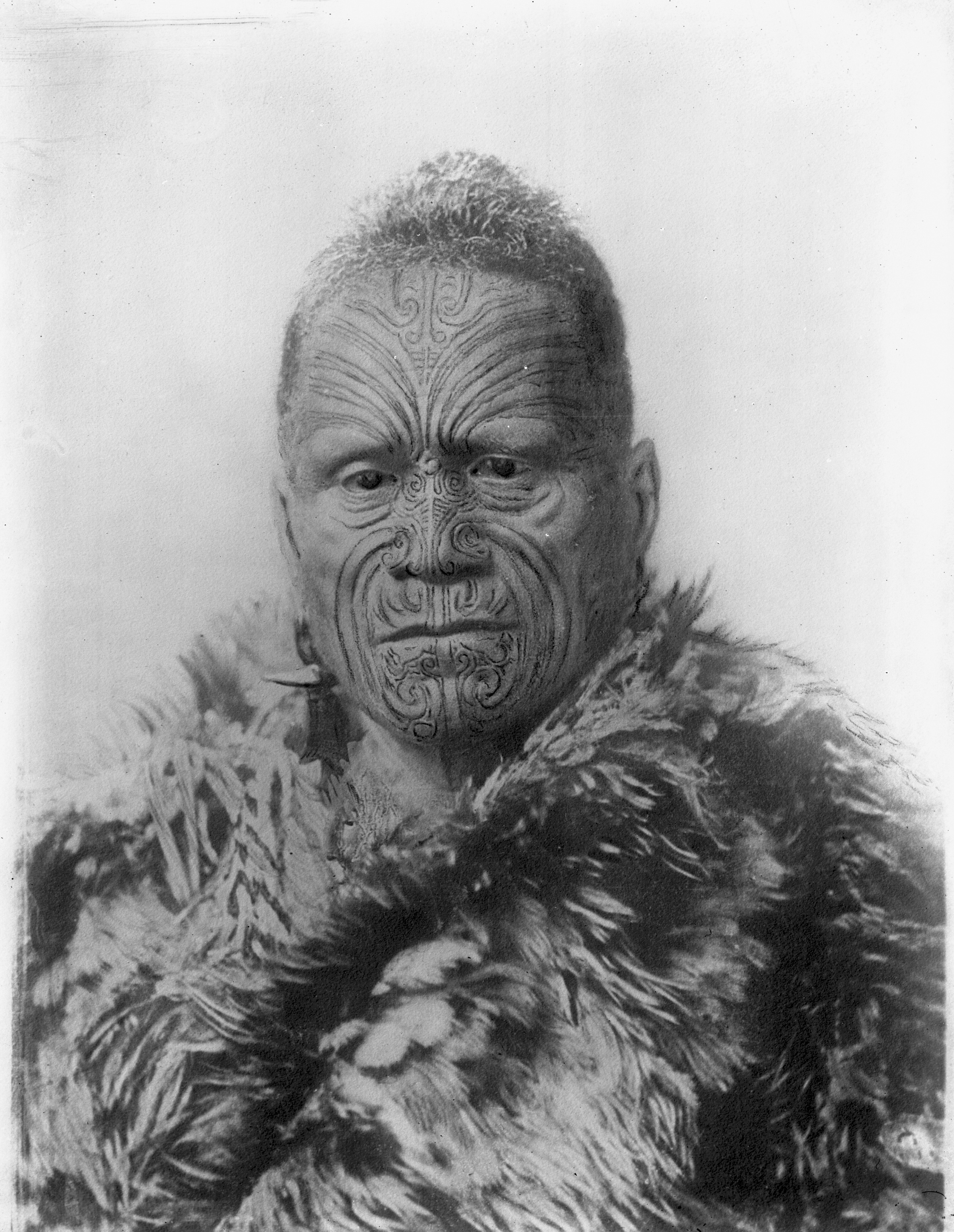
Tāwhiao

Mormons tell stories about early church members, The Three Nephites, and spirits of dead people. Mormons often retell stories about how early members of the church endured persecution and hardships in order to inspire other members. Stories about plural wives often tell of the women's plight in having to share a husband, or the opposite, the convenient companionship of her sister wives. J. Golden Kimball was a member of the Seventy and a folk hero known for swearing and undermining authority; stories told about him are often humorous. Stories about Joseph Smith, Brigham Young, Eliza Snow, and other founders have a near-mythic status.

The Three Nephites are three Nephite disciples chosen by Jesus in the Book of Mormon to never die. In modern Three Nephites stories, one or more of these men appear to give assistance to those in need and then mysteriously disappear. The assistance ranges from providing childcare to fixing a car. According to William Wilson, Three Nephites stories "reflect and reinforce church programs and, by endowing them with mystical values, place them beyond criticism or questioning."

Many Mormons engage in genealogy research in order to perform baptisms for the dead. One common folk narrative is for a researcher to have lost hope of finding more information, only to miraculously find it in a book or cemetery. There are also many stories of spirits helping church members to perform their temple work for the dead or conveying their gratitude somehow.

Folk beliefs regarding LDS Church history include the following:

- that the writings of the early Church Fathers conform better with Mormonism than with modern Christianity
- that in 1739 a Roman Catholic monk predicted that within 100 years an angel would be sent by God to restore the lost gospel to the earth and that the true church would be established in "a valley that lies towards a great lake", for Mormons the angel was Angel Moroni, the "lost gospel" was the Book of Mormon which Joseph Smith (who lived in the 1800s) translated from the Golden plates that Moroni gave him, the "true church" was the LDS Church founded by Smith with its location matching up with the LDS Church's modern headquarters in Utah where the "valley" is the Salt Lake Valley and the "lake" is the Great Salt Lake
- the miracle of the gulls, in which the crops of early Mormon settlers in Utah Territory were saved from destruction by a vast flock of seagulls that ate swarms of Mormon crickets that were devouring the crops
- that when speaking to the Latter Day Saints after the death of Joseph Smith, Brigham Young took on the appearance, voice, and mannerisms of Smith and that this was a sign from God that Young was to be Smith's successor
- that Māori prophets or chieftains, including Paora Te Potangaroa and Tāwhiao, predicted the coming of Mormon missionaries to New Zealand
- that various theories explain reasons for the priesthood ban on black people holding the priesthood before the 1978 Revelation on Priesthood, even when these reasons are repudiated by current LDS Church leaders and scholars
  - that the curse of Cain or the curse of Ham justified the racial restriction policy
  - that they were neutral in the War in Heaven
  - that it was done in order to protect them from the lowest rung of hell, since one of few damnable sins is to abuse the exercise of the priesthood

=== Predictions ===
The following are examples of predictions or prophecies that are part of Mormon folklore:

- that the day will come that the United States Constitution will "hang by a thread" and that members of the church will be central in rescuing it and the United States from destruction (See also: White Horse Prophecy)
- that God will restore the Adamic language
- that the Dream Mine will provide financial relief for believers in Utah after the disasters leading up to the Second Coming

=== Folk songs ===
In the 1850s and 1860s, Mormons used secular songs for worship and entertainment. They wrote their own poetry and set it to the familiar, secular tunes. One popular tune was "The Sea". Early church leader W. W. Phelps composed lyrics to the tune, as did fellow pioneer Joseph Cain. Some songs satirized other religions, as in "The God that others worship" set to the tune "The rose that all are praising." Mormons also penned songs about persecution and Joseph and Hyrum's death. Many songs about Brigham Young circulated, depicting Young as either a tyrannical leader with a troubled home life or a righteous leader whose guidance led the Mormons into prosperity. In the case of "Brigham, Brigham Young," the song was accepted when performed by a Mormon for other Mormons, but incited a riot when performed for mixed company. L.M. Hilton's version of "Hard Times" emphasized optimism in the face of persecution; Hilton said that it was one of Brigham Young's favorite songs and that he would sing it to Mormons to cheer them up.

== Descriptions of customs ==
=== Testimonies ===
Relating conversion narratives is one of the many ways Mormons express their faith. During monthly fast and testimony meeting held on fast Sunday, some members voluntarily share their dedication to their faith in a ritualized way, including informal ritualized expressions. Some of these informal ritualized expressions are so frequent that members joke about playing "testimony bingo" when they hear commonly used phrases like "I know beyond a shadow of a doubt" or "I know the church is true." Conversion narratives are commonly related by LDS members in a way that mirrors the conversion of Joseph Smith: as a search for knowledge leading to receiving the "gift of true religious knowledge" and conversion to the gospel. Folklore student Amy Ward studied the conversion narratives of lifelong members and adult converts to the LDS church. She found that adult converts were more likely to describe their conversion was part of a long, unconscious search for religious truth. Folklore scholar Eric Eliason notes that Mormons tend to prefer sincere, even humorous, conversion narratives over melodramatic or self-serving ones.

Marriage confirmation narratives, told in communal cooperation settings, relate how people let God or a church leader decide whom they should marry. This helped them to overcome their anxiety about whom to choose to marry. The folk belief that there exists only one suitable marriage partner, perpetuated in Mormon media but not supported by Mormon theology, exacerbates this anxiety. Generally, marriage confirmation narratives support the idea that righteous living within Mormon expectations will lead to blessings like receiving spiritual revelation about who should become one's marriage partner and having a happy marriage. Such narratives help reinforce Mormon ideas about Mormons being a chosen community who receive special spiritual experiences, and help establish and fortify socially desirable behavior.

Some Mormon women experience a vision of a future child that inspired them to have more children. If the next child is different from the child in the vision, the woman knows that the child is still "coming" and has another child. Margaret K. Brady documented this narrative type and sees it as a way to relieve Mormon women from the guilt they feel about thinking not to have more children, because the vision encourages them to change their mind and have more children. Sometimes these women share this experience in a visionary narrative. Telling the story reinforces the woman's spiritual identity, thus giving her a measure of power in her religious community.

=== Courtship and families ===
Creative date invitations are pervasive in the Idaho, Utah, and Arizona area, starting in the 1970s when young women were encouraged to ask young men to Sadie Hawkins dances. Folklorist Kristi Young writes that creative date invitations allowed young women to feel more comfortable asking young men on dates, since creative date invitations often do not require face-to-face interaction. Sometimes the recipient of a creative date invitation will accept even if they already have a significant other.

The LDS Church encourages families to meet together in "family home evening" on Monday nights. Assignments for prayer, song, lesson, game, and treat are often rotated between family members on homemade charts. Certain rituals are performed during life events. After a baby is born, it is given a blessing, usually by their father with other male relatives and friends joining the blessing circle. Children are usually baptized at age eight, and receive a patriarchal blessing sometime in their teens. Young men and women may volunteer to be a missionary. In LDS funerals, the deceased wears their ceremonial temple clothing to be buried.

=== Pioneer Day ===
The first Pioneer Day was celebrated in 1849, with Mormons in Salt Lake City marching in wards, or congregational groups, around Temple Square in a show of patriotism. Many other towns in Utah had their own celebrations. Steven Olson notes that Pioneer Day celebrations reenact an idealized culture, providing a window into Mormon culture. Celebrations in the latter half of the 19th century emphasized how Mormons were a free, blessed, and chosen people. Floats and decorations celebrated agricultural bounties that Mormons saw as God blessing their settlement. Mormon leaders were escorted from their homes to the celebrations, where they participated as speakers. Parades separated participants by age and gender and celebrated traditional gender roles. Dances and sports competitions were common.

In Utah where Pioneer Day is an official holiday, the day is celebrated with fireworks and historical reenactments. However, outside of Utah, observance depends on local members; often a congregation will have pioneer-themed talks but no festivities. Dutch Mormons tend not to celebrate it, but in Germany, Pioneer Day is popular among Mormons.

=== On temples ===
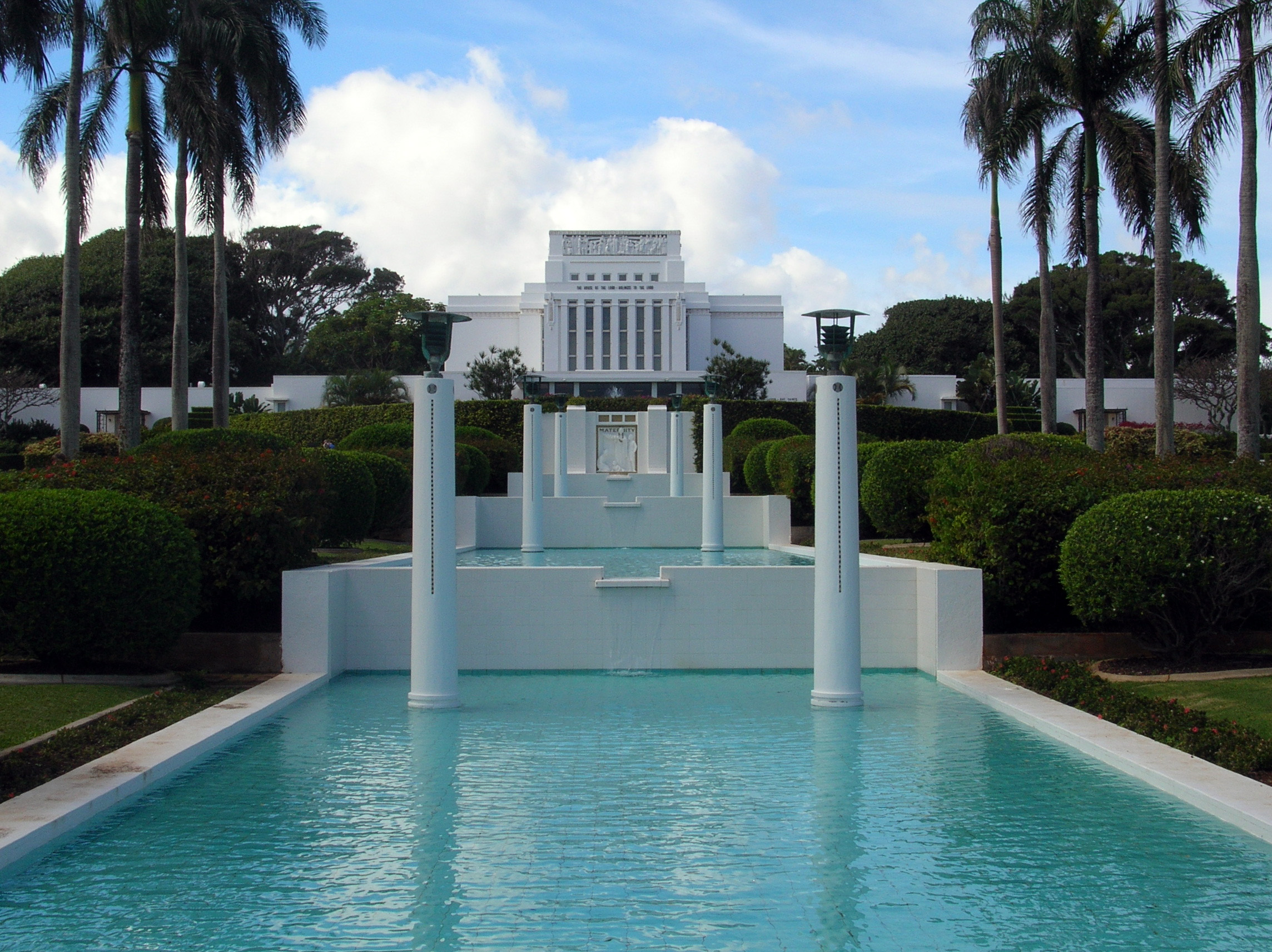
Laie Hawaii Temple

Folk beliefs regarding LDS temples include the following:

- that in designing the Salt Lake Temple, Brigham Young had the foresight to make space accommodation for future technological advancements such as elevators, air conditioning, and electrical wiring
- that on December 7, 1941, Japanese aircraft pilots attempted to bomb or strafe the church's Hawaiian Temple just prior to or just after the attack on Pearl Harbor, but were prevented from doing so by mechanical failures or an unseen protective force, and that the Japanese pilot who attempted to bomb or strafe the Hawaiian Temple was converted to the LDS Church after he saw a picture of the temple in the possession of Mormon missionaries in Japan
- that Tāwhiao accurately predicted the site of the 1958 Hamilton New Zealand Temple before his death in 1894;
- that the Freiberg Germany Temple, which was the first Mormon temple in a Communist state when it was dedicated in East Germany in 1985 (at that time, the temple was called the "Freiberg GDR Temple", from "German Democratic Republic", East Germany's official name) by its very presence in the country had hastened the fall of the communist regime in 1989 which in turn led to its reunification with West Germany to form modern-day Germany; the Freiberg area's prosperity in the relatively poor eastern Germany is also attributed to the temple's location in the city
- that wearing temple garments affords physical protection, and that some wearers have survived car wrecks, floods, and other calamities unscathed thanks to the protective power of the garments

=== Other customs ===
In the mid-20th century, several performance art traditions helped revive folk arts. Church-wide folk-dancing festivals taught folk dancing to Mormon youth in the 1970s. Roadshows allowed members to exercise their creative talents on a smaller scale.

In some missions, it is common to burn clothing to mark special missionary anniversaries, such as a tie after six months of service and a shirt after one year.

== Material objects ==
=== Handicrafts ===
Pine furniture, pottery, wool textiles, quilts, woodwork, decorative needlework, and toys have unique Mormon elements. In early Mormon history, pioneers gathered in Utah from Europe and other parts of the world, bringing their knowledge of handicrafts with them. Utah pioneers were isolated and had to make most of their own clothes and linens. They adapted the techniques they knew to the materials they had on hand. Local historian Shirley B. Paxman argues that the pioneers's limited materials combined with their isolation resulted in work that was not self-conscious. Since pioneer women did not think of themselves as artists, their decorative work was for their own or their family's simple pleasure. Pioneer women in Utah made their own yarn, linen thread and silk thread. In the 1870s, pioneer women sold their handicrafts in cooperative stores owned by the Relief Society. When handicrafts were no longer a necessity, they were promoted as improving mental health. Handicrafts for Women, published by the Relief Society in 1935, encouraged women to learn handicrafts to relieve them of the monotony of housework. In the early 20th century, Relief Societies held monthly homemaking days to learn and practice household arts and crafts including needlework and quilting. In 1963, handicrafts saw a resurgence in popularity that coincided with the Relief Society Magazine's new feature on arts and crafts.

Relief Society crafts are one way that folk art is disseminated between Mormons. In 1963, crafter Ruby Swallow made resin grapes using old Christmas ornaments as molds. She presented the craft at a stake homemaking activity, and soon after taught her technique in a local craft store. The craft remained unusually popular, and many homes in the Intermountain West had a set by the 1970s. Eleanor Zimmerman, who helped popularize the grapes, said that the craft was popular because it was handmade but "looked store-bought." Mark L. Staker, a curator for the Museum of Church History and Art, believes that the staying power of resin grapes is partially because they were made as a community, and also because Relief Society Magazine began emphasizing arts and crafts in 1963. One popular genre of crafts turns inexpensive utilitarian objects into decorative ones.

Utahns created a Utah quilt guild in 1977 to promote and preserve quilt making techniques. In documenting pioneer quilts, the Utah quilt guild found a wide variety of styles, including paper piecing, applique, and crazy quilt styles. Quilts were a common wedding gift. Pioneer quilts often featured natural imagery, with sego lilies and beehives being special symbols of Mormon pioneers. English and humanities professor Yvonne Milspaw studied contemporary American regional quilting and found that Utah Mormon quilters were the most innovative and relaxed about traditional quilt patterns. Pictorial quilts and quilts that incorporate memorabilia, like boy scout badges and silk-screened photos, were common. The annual Springville Quilt Show accepts both hand-stitched and machine-quilted quilts.

Hair jewellery and wreaths were among the popular handicrafts in the 19th century, especially in the 1860s and '70s. Hair flowers made by Mormons, like those in the rest of the United States, traditionally had a woman's hair for the petals and her husband's for the center. Watch chains made from hair were commonly sent to missionaries to remind them of family members. The Salt Lake temple entrance had a hair wreath containing hair from prominent church leaders on display until 1967. Hair wreaths containing hair from multiple people were displayed in public areas, symbolizing community unity.

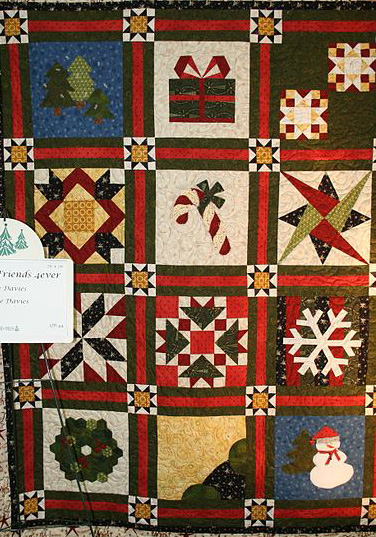
Book Club Friends 4ever quilted by Dixie Davies. Sampler patch style with Christmas prints.

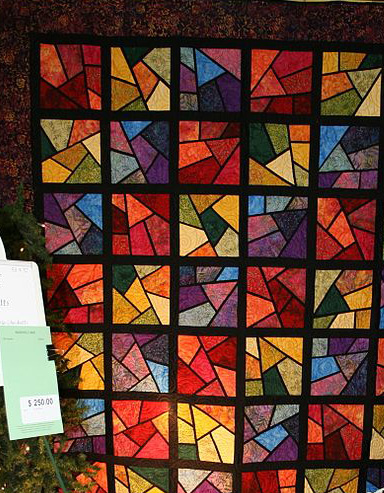
Shattered quilted by Pamela Checketts and Sue's Quilts Shop.

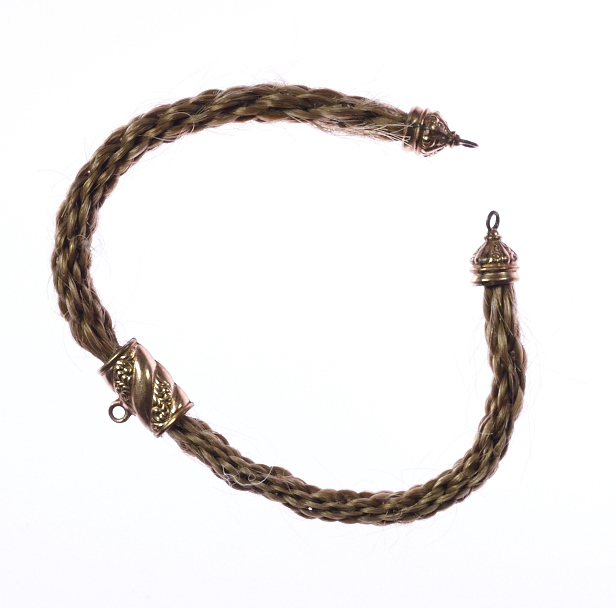
Human Hair Bracelet belonging to Zina Presendia Young Williams Card

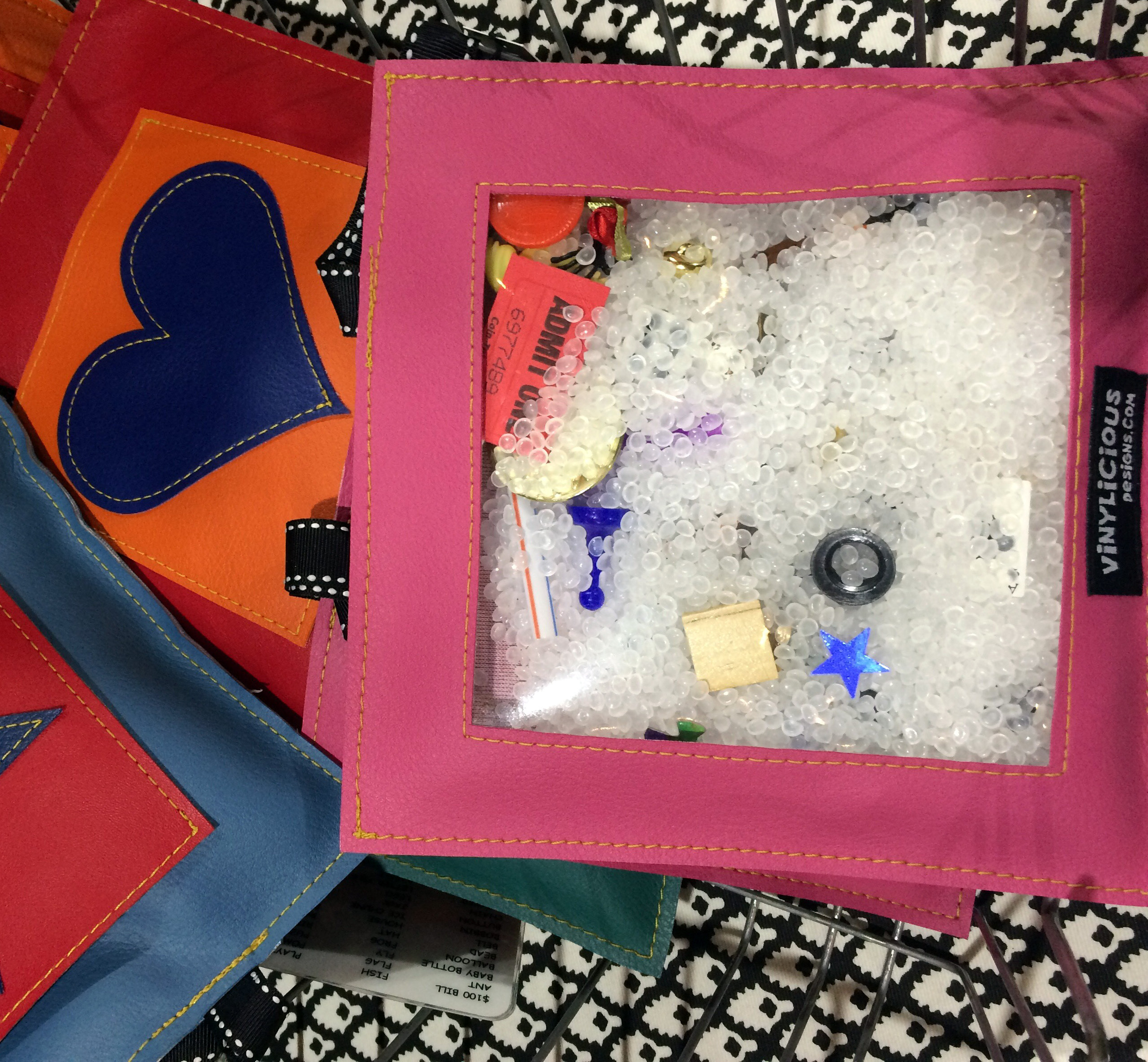
Hidden object toy

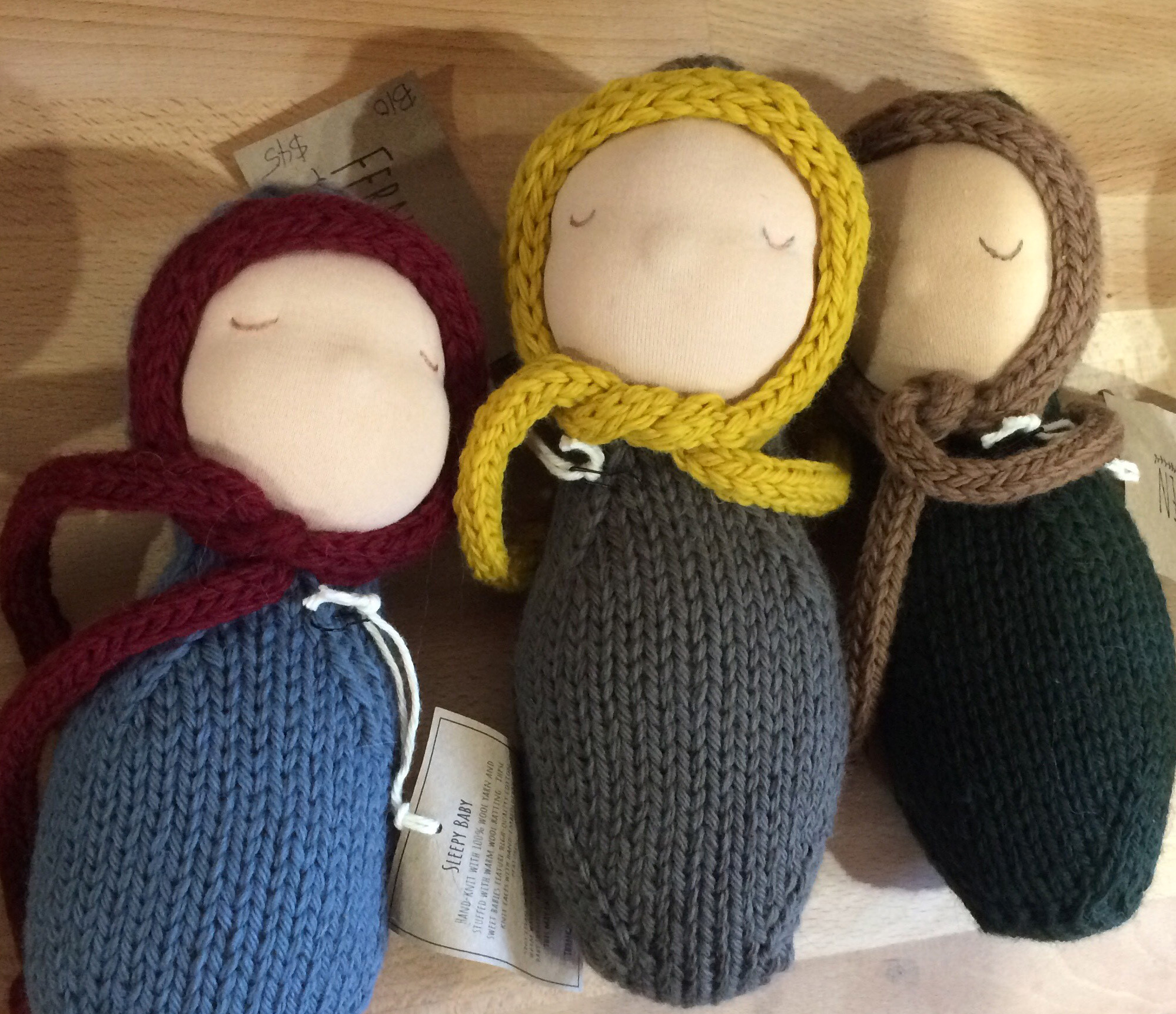
Handmade dolls

=== Furniture ===
Early Utah pioneers in 1847 used wood from hardwood packing boxes as material for furniture. Steam-driven lathes made Roman turned legs and furniture with spool-turned decoration popular. Leaders encouraged craftsmanship, and cabinetmakers made their own designs, usually influenced by fashionable designs like the Empire style. Furniture makers adapted designs to local softwoods like cottonwood, box elder, and red and yellow pine. The legs and spindles of furniture made with soft wood had to be thicker to accommodate the same amount of weight as furniture made with hardwood.

In the 1850s and 60s, furniture was in great demand, but by 1869, there were enough cabinetmakers to create a variety of competing styles. William Bell, a cabinetmaker from England, worked for Brigham Young and made a variety of simple yet fashionable pieces. He crafted a few unique pieces, including an octagonal rotating desk with painted graining to simulate other textures, and a reclining chair. Ralph Ramsay, another Mormon pioneer furniture maker, used Bell's workshop to carve a large eagle that decorated the entrance to Brigham Young's property. Ramsay carved many other details iconic to Mormon architecture, including the original oxen supporting baptismal fonts in temples, the casework for the Salt Lake Tabernacle organ, and an ornate personal bed.

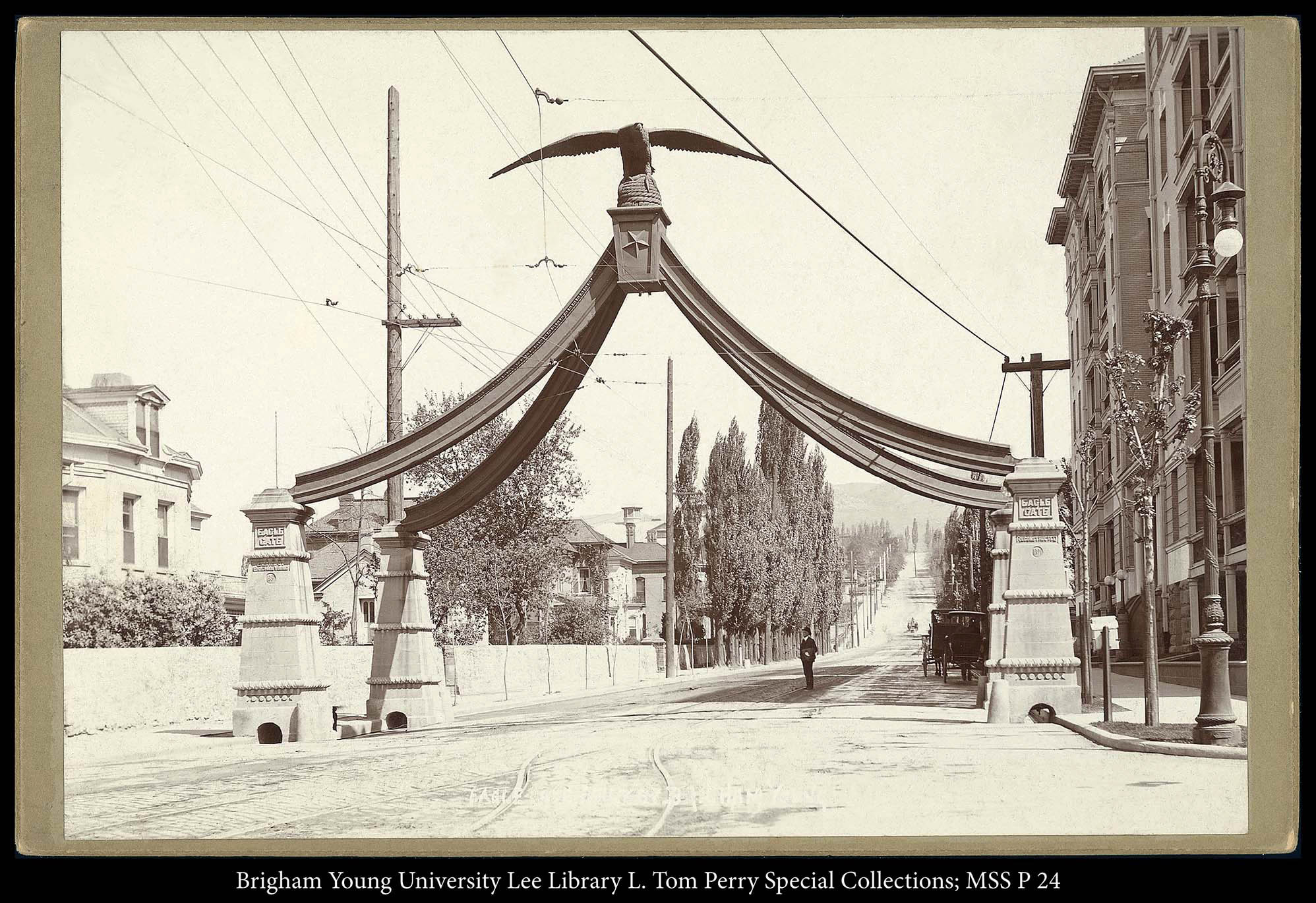
Eagle gate made by Ralph Ramsay

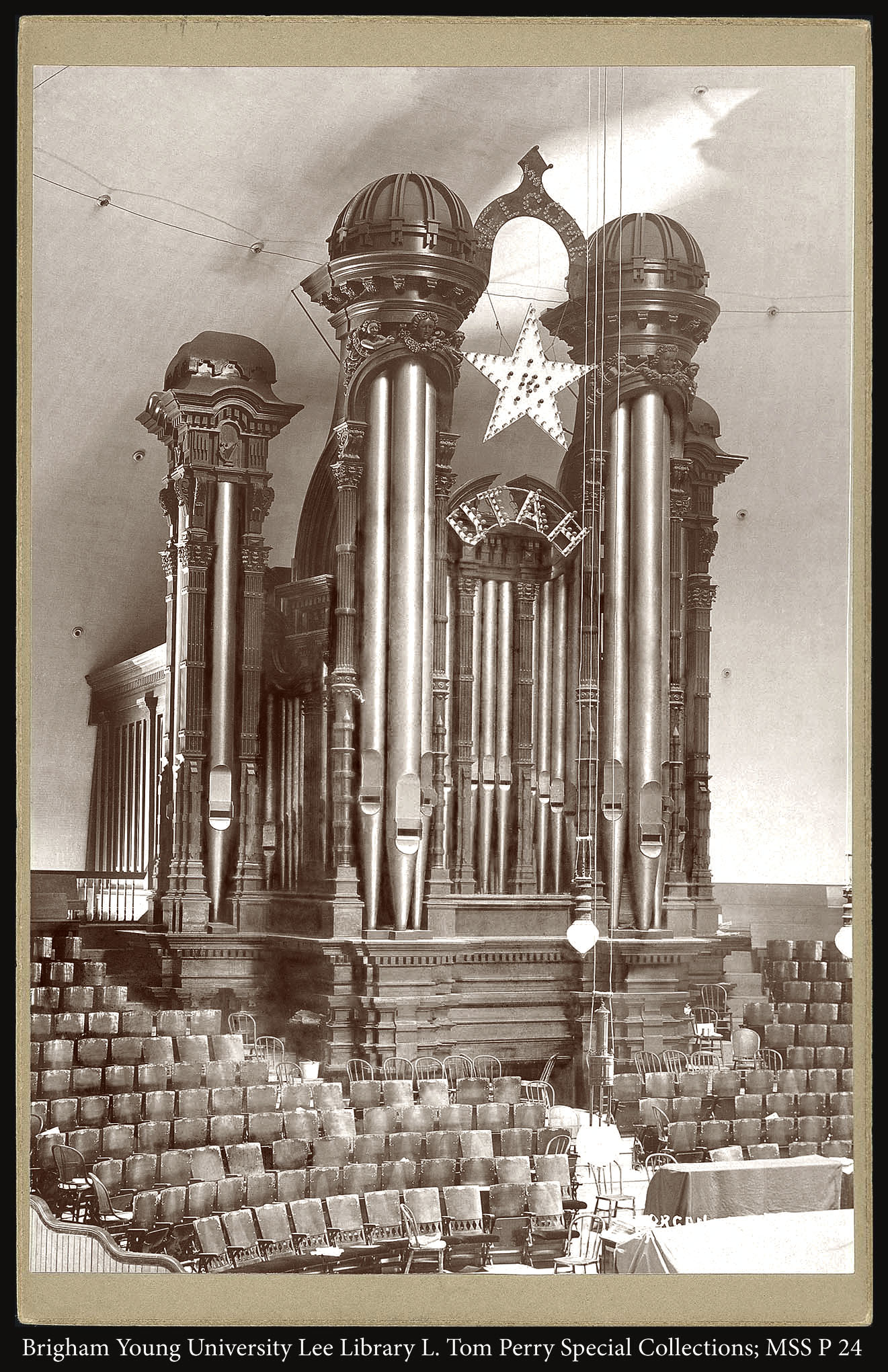
Salt Lake Tabernacle organ in 1901

Other pioneer craftsmen tried to adapt to conditions in Utah. Potters made jars and pots for local needs. Local soil was high in alkali, and traditional glazes were ineffective. Pioneers preferred the cheaper factory-made pottery, and by the end of the 19th century, only Erich C. Henrichsen's pottery remained in business, selling unglazed machine-made flower pots. Blacksmiths recycled any metal they could find and had consistent work to do, shoeing horses and repairing farm equipment. By the 1890s, most craftsmen were struggling to support themselves, as they could not compete with factory-made goods brought by the railway. Since the church's emphasis on emergency preparedness, some Mormons have created storage space for preserved food inside furniture.

=== Architecture ===
Rural Mormon settlements have several features that, when found together, distinguish them from non-Mormon settlements. These include wide roads, irrigation ditches, unpainted barns, and special wooden hay derricks. Lombardy poplars were often grown in rows to act as a windbreak, and streets were often numbered in grid fashion. A two-story symmetrical home with a chimney on either end was popular, and called "I"-style or "Nauvoo"-style homes. "I"-style homes were often built adjoining one another in "L", "H", or "T" style homes. Homes were often built using adobe.

Brigham Young instructed pioneers to build "beautiful" houses, and from 1847 to 1890, architects experimented with various decorations they found in house pattern books. Greek revival-inspired decorations included window heads in pediment shape, entablature, and plain cornice returns. For Gothic revival decorations, architects used intricate bargeboards and spired finials to traditional house plans. Dormers were popular and were built in many varying styles. Late 19th-century styles like Victorian were not common. Traditional house plans came from Colonial Georgian architecture. External designs were usually bilaterally symmetric, with three distinct components, one of which was centered to preserve symmetry. Second-story windows were built direct above first-story windows in this style. Architectural eclecticism was common, and architects sometimes used unusual solutions to create symmetric facades.

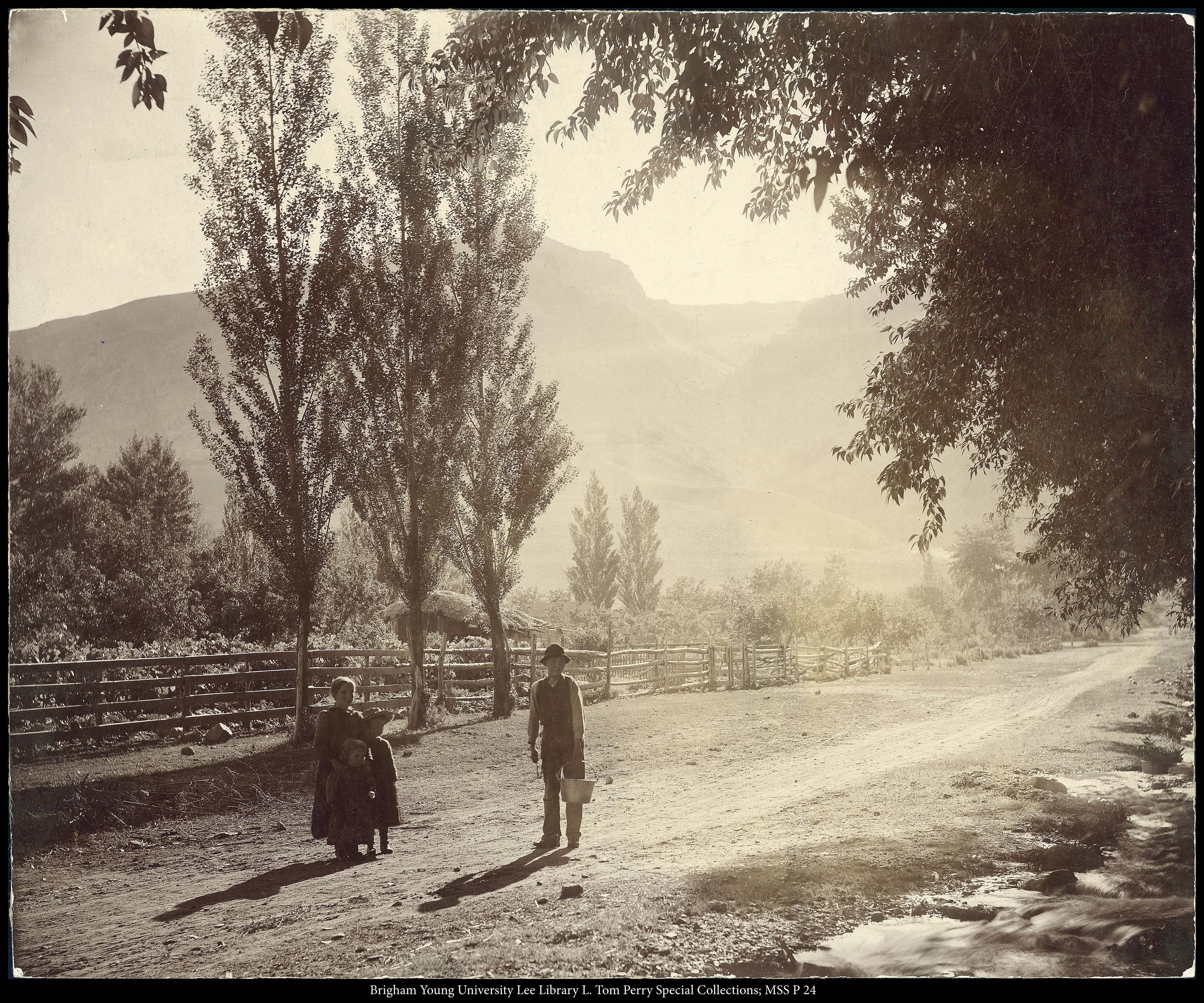
Willard, Utah with poplars in the background

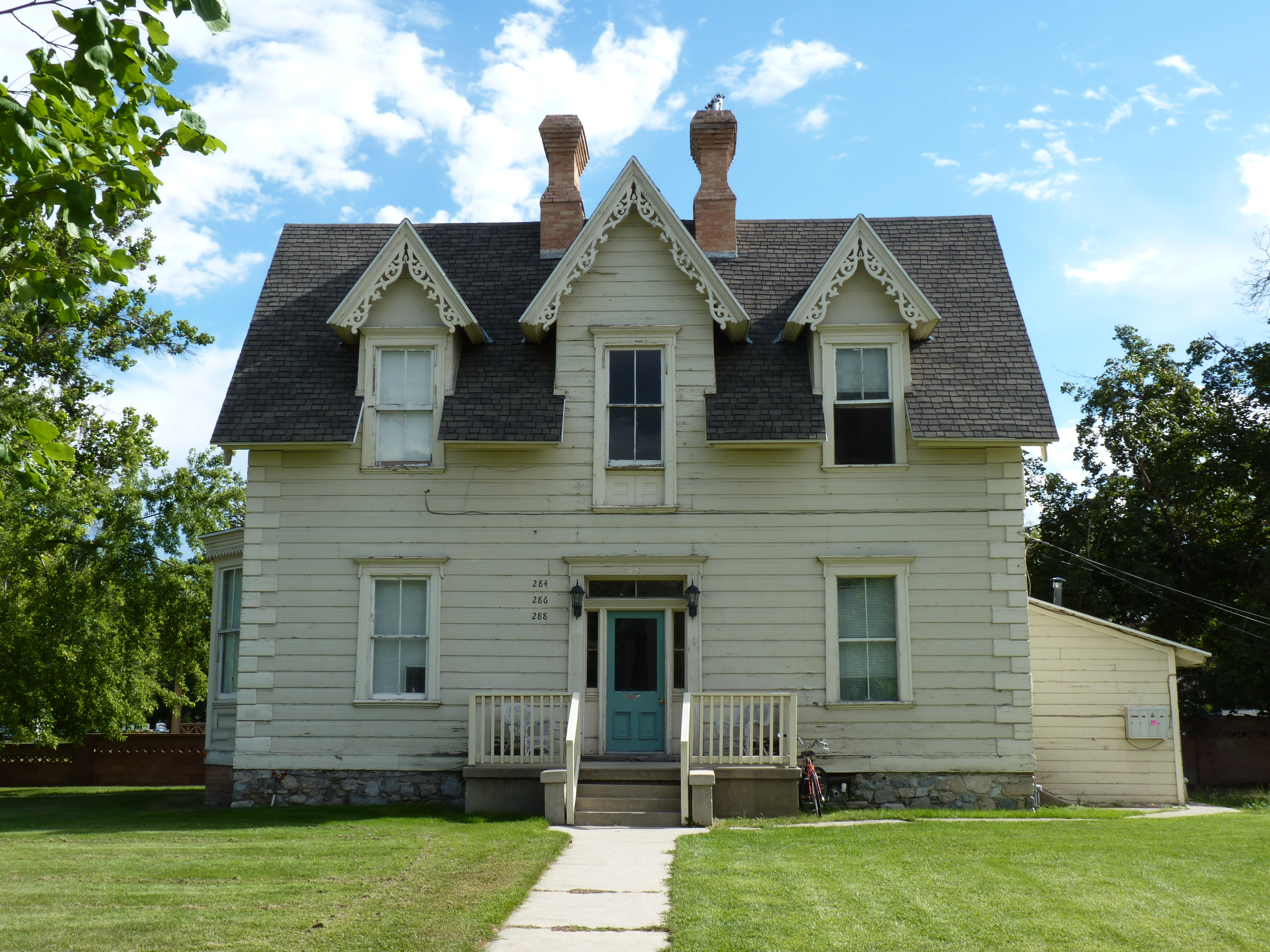
George M. Brown House, built in the 1880s, uses bilateral triparte symmetry in its facade. The decorations are in the Gothic revival style.

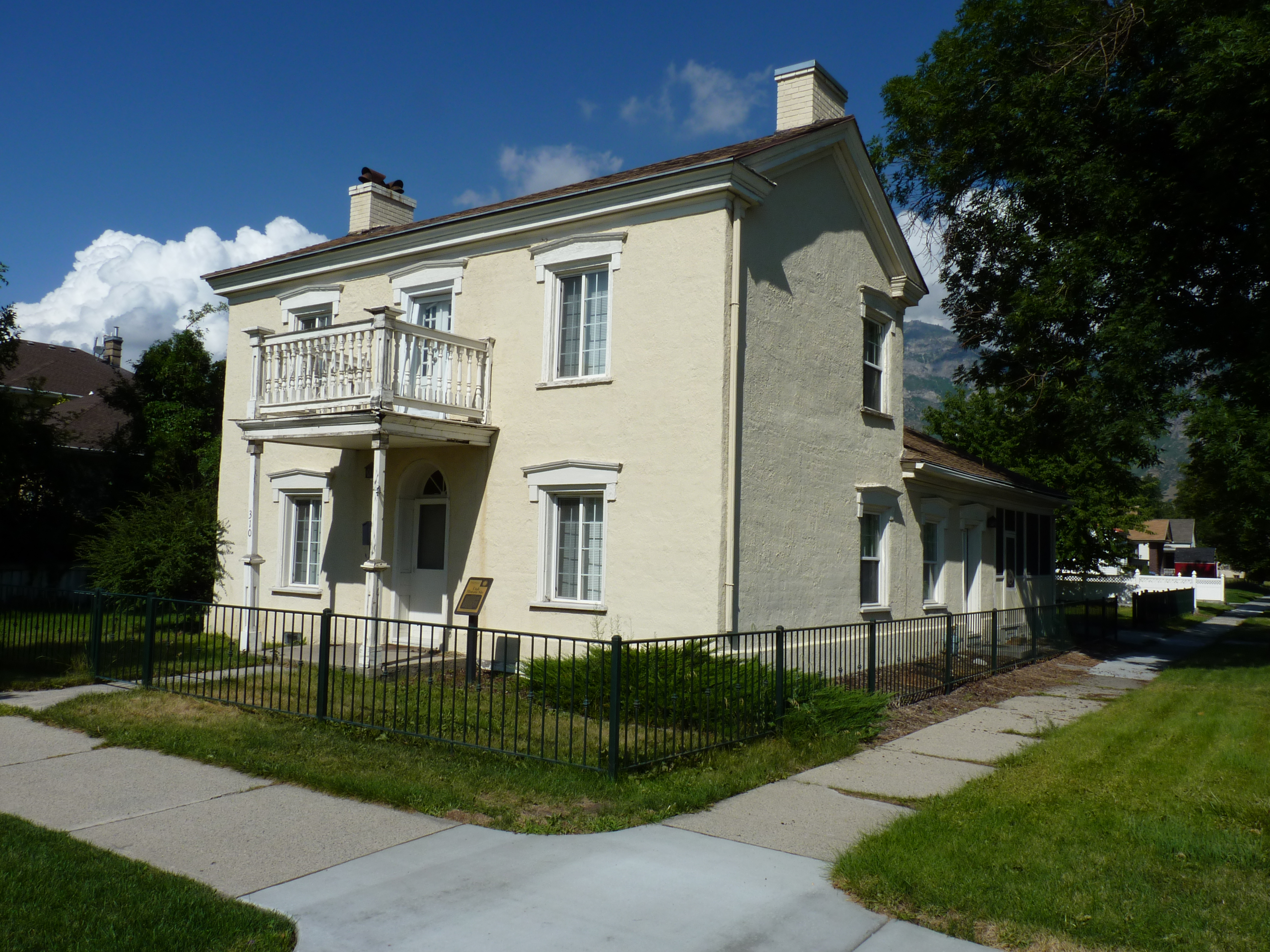
Clark–Taylor House, built around 1854

=== Gravestones ===
In the 19th century, the most popular symbol for gravestones in the Mormon cultural region was that of two hands clasped, as if in a handshake. Carol Edison, former director of the Utah Art Council's Folk Arts Program, interprets the symbol as having multiple meanings, representing either a goodbye to living relatives or a greeting to deceased relatives. The clasped hands design was especially popular for upright marble grave markers. Starting around 1910, images of temples on gravestones appeared, reinforcing Mormon beliefs about families remaining together after death. With sandblasting technology in the 1960s, carving images of temples became much easier. Over a quarter of gravestone orders in 2013 included a temple image. Many temple gravestones include the names of husband and wife on the same gravestone and the date of their temple sealing. The names of the children of the couple are sometimes also listed on the gravestone, showing the importance of the family unit.

== Mormon fundamentalists ==
Mormon fundamentalist communities practice polygamy. A few sects practice arranged marriages, but it is "probably more common" for spouses to court a wife through religious persuasion. Fundamentalists describe their practice of polygamy as a vital part of their religious devotion. Family organization depends on individual style; in some families, the first wife takes a superior role to the younger wives; in others, they are scrupulously treated equally. Traditional dances are popular, especially the double scottische. Modest but modern clothing is common. Fundamentalist communities strongly value frugal cooperative self-reliance, often home-schooling their children and relying on alternative medicine. Many families receive financial assistance from the government. Past government raids provide touchstones for communal memory, and members recount their own and their ancestors' experiences with persecution.

== See also ==
- Christian mythology
- Culture of The Church of Jesus Christ of Latter-day Saints
- Ethnic religion
- Folk religion
- Folkloristics
- Mormon art
- Symbolism in The Church of Jesus Christ of Latter-day Saints
- Death in 19th-century Mormonism
