= Death in 19th-century Mormonism =

Topic in the history of Mormonism

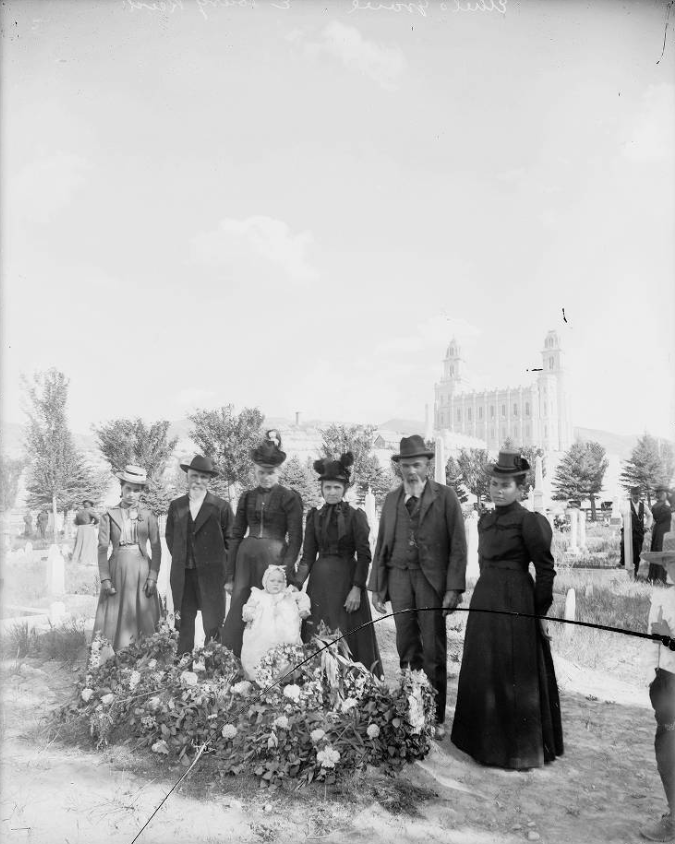
A Latter-day Saint funeral in 1899, in the Manti Cemetery near the Manti Utah Temple

Death in 19th-century Mormonism involved several unique religious rituals, cultural customs, and eschatological beliefs. In the years of the Church of Christ and, later, in the Church of Jesus Christ of Latter-day Saints (LDS Church), death played a prominent role in the lives of members due to various diseases, forced removal from settlements, the harsh nature of life on the American frontier, and the lack of medical knowledge at the time. Mormon mortality rates climbed through most of the century until a permanent settlement in Utah Territory was established and advances in medical science were made. Before these improvements, the commonality of death in Latter-day Saint communities produced a distinct culture surrounding the death of a member of the community. The dying were either blessed to be healed or to be received into heaven, depending on the person's wishes. A phenomenon known as the "beautiful death" set forth traditions such as family and friends gathering around a person's deathbed to witness their transition into the next life. Nineteenth-century Latter-day Saints came to terms with the frequent deaths of loved ones – especially those of infants and children – by turning to the teachings offered by their religion.

The early Latter-day Saints' respect for the dead is evidenced by burial and funeral traditions. Corpses were washed, dressed, and laid in graves, most often in cemeteries. A member of the church then blessed the gravesite to be protected until the resurrection. Postmortem treatment of fellow church members was an organized community effort most often led by women. Sermons and poetry were composed to memorialize the deceased; death masks, coffin canes, and locks of hair also served as tokens of the person's life and were believed to possess spiritual power. Mormons believed that glorious rewards awaited the righteous in the afterlife. Both teachings from 19th-century church leaders and near-death experiences recorded by church members at the time attest to a pleasant existence after death in a realm called the "spirit world." This desired fate was believed to be attainable only through baptism and the ordinances received in LDS temples.

== Causes of death ==
Death was extremely common among early Latter Day Saints due to both disease and conflict. Expulsion from settlements in Ohio, Missouri, and Illinois resulted in small skirmishes such as the Battle of Crooked River and Haun's Mill massacre, contributing to the Mormon death toll. Additionally, most Mormon women lost at least one child soon after giving birth, and one third of babies born did not survive to adulthood. Six of Joseph and Emma Smith's eleven children died, many in infancy.

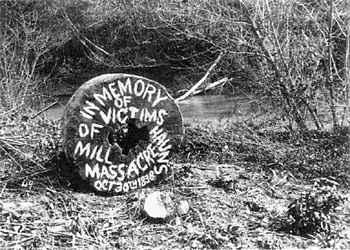
An early memorial of the victims of the Haun's Mill massacre (ca. 1907)

Especially in the years before the American Civil War, medical science was severely limited; the smallest of injuries could become infected and prove to be fatal. Smith, the founder of the Latter Day Saint movement, spoke of his distrust of traditional physicians after the use of calomel contributed to the premature death of his brother Alvin. Botanical medicine was often used as a substitute for traditional methods. When the Word of Wisdom was revealed, urging the use of herbs for the body, this trend only increased. Herbal medicine was seen as God's prescribed way of treating ailments, so botanical physicians were held in high esteem. The Latter Day Saints turned to traditional doctors when surgery was needed, but used their own remedies to treat illness. They developed several natural treatments that proved to be especially useful during their years spent as pioneers on the American frontier. Each move westward presented new health challenges.

=== On the American frontier ===
==== Far West, Missouri ====
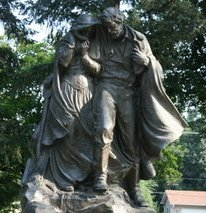
Statue at the Mormon Pioneer Cemetery depicting a man and woman at the grave of their child

From 1836 to 1839, the Latter Day Saints' mainly settled in Far West, Missouri. It was here that they began the practice of maintaining rural cemeteries, burial grounds located outside city limits. Approximately 200 to 300 Mormons were buried in the Far West burial ground, including David W. Patten, Gideon Carter, and many other victims of the Battle of Crooked River, which occurred in 1838. The bodies of some deceased Latter Day Saints were transported miles in order to be interred in Far West with other people of the faith. Graves were commonly marked using wooden stakes, which collapsed and withered over time. After the Mormons left Far West, the cemetery was abandoned, eventually becoming farmland.

==== Disease in Nauvoo ====
In the 1830s and 1840s, "Mormon mortality rates rose … due to … the unhealthy conditions in Nauvoo." The swampy environment of this Mormon settlement in Illinois exposed the Latter Day Saints to diseases such as malaria and tuberculosis. The young commonly contracted whooping cough, meningitis, scarlet fever, and convulsions. As a result, the population was highly acquainted with death. Scholars today have argued that these challenges led Joseph Smith to address death and salvation more often in his preaching. He and Brigham Young occasionally referred to diseases as demonic possessions, but this teaching died out when the field of medicine advanced and illnesses began to be understood.

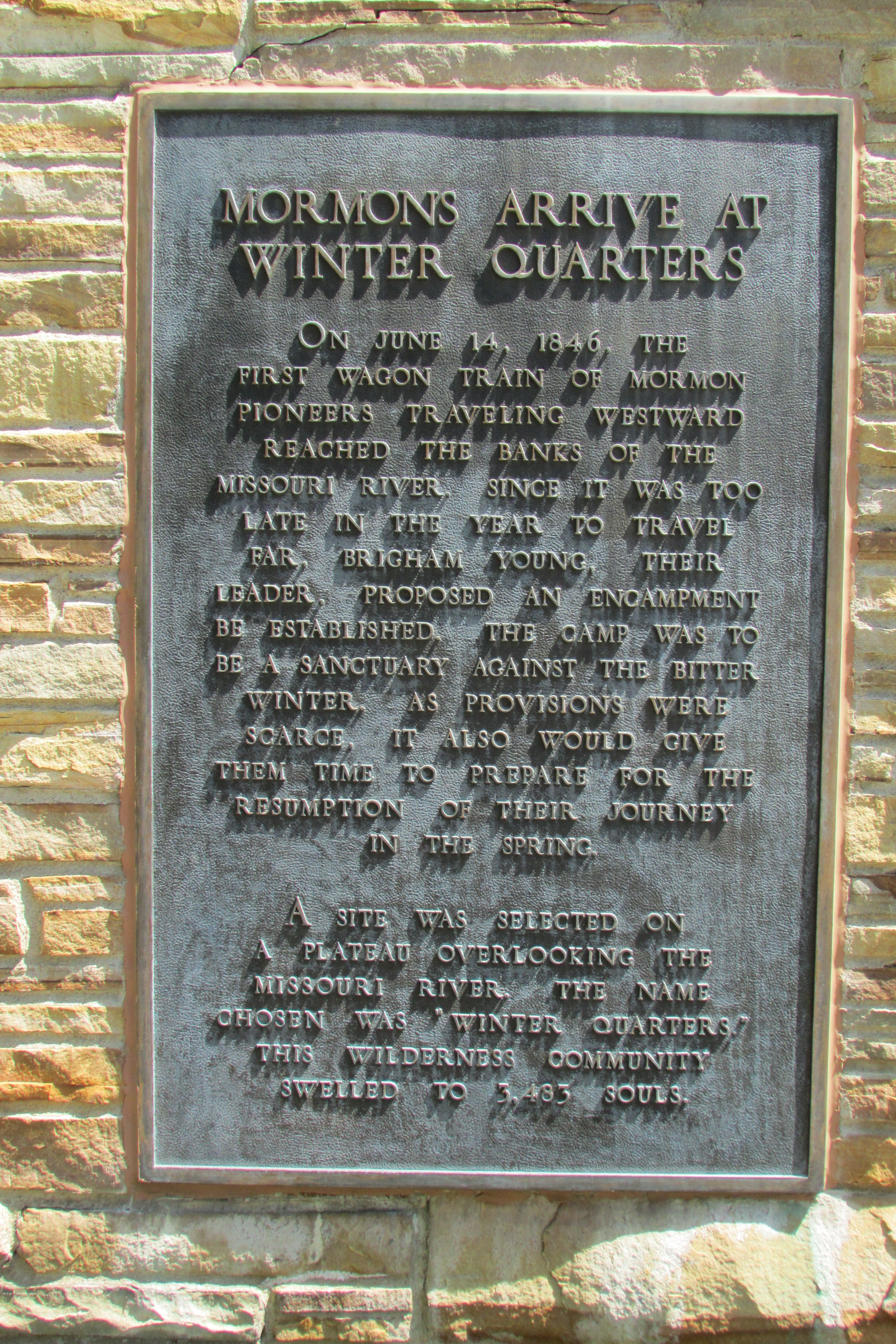
Memorial plaque at the Mormon Pioneer Cemetery in Florence, Nebraska

==== Winter Quarters, Nebraska ====
Hardship only increased with the Mormons' departure from Illinois. An estimated one in twelve Latter-day Saints "died in … camps during the first year" of their journey west. "Several hundred Mormon graves" are found in Winter Quarters, Nebraska. Here, scurvy was the main cause of death due to the lack of fruit and vegetables in the pioneers' diets during their winter travels. The 1846 Nauvoo War had forced them out of the city before they could prepare sufficient food and supplies for the journey. Eating only meat and grains led to malnutrition, which then resulted in cases of noma. Some also died due to exposure to the elements. The death rates in Winter Quarters were three times as high as those of Nauvoo. Accurate records were difficult to keep, but modern historians have estimated that more than 600 people died in this camp. A statue of two parents mourning the death of their newborn child stands at the Mormon Pioneer Cemetery in Florence, Nebraska, commemorating those who were lost and those who lived on to complete the trek west.

==== Utah ====
As in eastern Mormon settlements earlier in the century, "over a third of children born in Utah [in the late 1800s] never reached adulthood". Settling the western U.S. presented challenges such as obtaining sufficient nutrition and establishing healthcare, but it also protected the Latter-day Saints from the cholera and smallpox epidemics raging on the east coast. Fortunately, life expectancy did increase in Utah Territory. Once they acclimated to the climate, males were expected to live to age 71 and females to age 67. The absence of tobacco in Mormon culture also contributed to low adult mortality rates. They did slightly rise, however, from the 1860s to the 1880s; the influx of immigrants to Utah – brought on by the 1869 completion of the transcontinental railroad – led to the spread of more contagious diseases, particularly through the water supply. Salt Lake City faced a deadly diphtheria outbreak in 1879. Consumption of dirty water also led to dysentery, gastroenteritis, and typhoid fever. When knowledge of how to prevent disease spread towards the end of the century, church leaders released a statement urging members to maintain cleanliness, especially in the water they drank. The previously negative Latter-day Saint perception of the healthcare industry began to change as the field of medicine progressed. Reliance on herbal medicine, prevalent in the first half of the century, waned. More doctors moved to the intermountain West, and the church even sent some of its members to cities in the eastern U.S. to attend medical school and become traditional physicians.

== Early Mormon response to death and dying ==
After decades of experience with disease and other adversities, an increasing number of Latter-day Saints concluded that death was a necessary part of the human experience. The "context of tragedy" in which they lived "motivated deep and searching questions about death, salvation, and the eternal nature of families." Coping with the loss of young people proved to be a major challenge for 19th-century Mormons. LDS tradition offered some explanation for such hardship: when a young man died, it was believed that he was needed by God to do missionary work in the afterlife; and when children died, the bereaved often concluded that they were simply too pure to exist in this fallen world. Some parents comforted themselves by asserting that God had seen fit to take their child off the earth; Wilford Woodruff, the fourth president of the church, believed that such premature deaths were evidence of God's will being carried out.

Uncertainty surrounding a person's actual status as alive or dead was commonplace because of the limits of 19th-century medical science, which in turn produced myths of live burials and resurrections. Influenced by these and a Book of Mormon account of a king being mistakenly pronounced dead, some early Mormons occasionally attempted to bring corpses back to life. This applied particularly to those whose deaths were sudden, premature, or both. Joseph Smith Sr., the first patriarch in the LDS Church, purportedly blessed a handful of Latter Day Saints with the power to raise people from the dead. However, the early church leader Oliver Cowdery refuted this claim. A question-and-answer article in the July 1838 edition of the Elders' Journal, of which Joseph Smith was editor, asked if Mormons could revive the deceased; the answer given was: "No … but God can raise the dead through man, as an instrument." Common practice at the time was to observe the corpse overnight "to ensure that no sign of life was missed." This was dubbed as a "traditional wake." Women most often undertook this responsibility. In the summer months, they were diligent in maintaining enough ice around the body "to slow its decay and protect it from insects and rodents."

In general, Mormons preferred peaceful deaths and saw the event as one's transition to a place of both comfort and work, both rest and progress. Oftentimes, the Latter Day Saints did not dread death but saw it as an opportunity to escape the problems they faced in life. In the midst of opposition, Joseph Smith told his followers not to fear, for mobs "[could] only kill the body," not the soul. This belief led to the practice of "dedicating" the dying to speed up the process of death once it was obvious that a person was beyond saving. A prayer would be said aloud, pleading with God to accept the dying man or woman into heaven, and the actual event of death was expected to occur moments later. The person was also anointed with consecrated oil and blessed in preparation for their burial. This ceremony was seen as an important extension of the holy ordinances performed in temples; it was the last rite of passage, of sorts, for Mormons. Those who yearned to pass on to the next life and thus be relieved of pain and suffering often asked for this ritual to be performed for them. Once the Mormon pioneers reached Utah, more instances of dedicatory prayers for the dead were documented.

=== Healing rituals ===
Before death became obviously unavoidable, early Mormons occasionally attempted to heal the dying of ailments and save them. For them, the healing of the sick was a very possible and potent occurrence. They differed from their contemporaries on this account; most American Protestants opposed healing rituals because they resembled Catholic ceremonies. Most Latter Day Saints rejected the common Protestant belief that God appointed each person a definite, unchangeable time to die. Instead, they maintained that one could be saved through healing rituals.

A person's ability to be healed was primarily influenced by their faith; the greater their conviction that they could be saved from disease and death, the more likely God was to intervene. As Lester E. Bush, former associate editor of Dialogue: A Journal of Mormon Thought, summarizes, "miracles were to follow belief, not generate it." In addition, God had to be willing to grant a person's desire to be healed and survive. Scientist and historian Jonathan A. Stapley describes this as the belief that they "could wield the power of God and yet still be checked by his will." Healing for the Latter Day Saints involved a simple ritual: a drop of olive oil was placed on the top of the head of the diseased, and then a man holding the priesthood placed his hands on the person's head and prayed for them to be healed. Before 1844, the oil was sometimes fed to the person or put on other parts of their body besides the head – often the area affected by the disease or injury. As time went on, the Mormons began to attribute more and more strength to healing rites. Eliza R. Snow recorded that those who were sick and crippled would come to the temple to be healed, and would subsequently "throw away their crutches and go home whole." There are, however, accounts of Joseph Smith using consecrated oil to heal the sick and dying prior to the construction of Kirtland Temple, the first to be built by the Latter Day Saints. Some early Latter Day Saints also believed that being rebaptized could serve as a healing ritual; but this idea was officially rejected by church leaders in the early 20th century.

=== Comfort in belief ===
Whenever a death occurred, Mormons looked to their doctrine of the plan of salvation for comfort. A Times and Seasons author wrote in 1844 that "the highest point in the faith of the Latter Day Saints is that they know where they are going after death, and what they will do … and when a faithful saint dies … all Israel whispers … 'let me die the death of the righteous, and let my last end be like his.'" Like other 19th-century American Christians, Mormons focused on striving to live a life worthy of a glorious post-mortal destiny. They believed this would be made complete by the presence of family members, especially those who had died young. As a result of this, most Latter Day Saints did not emotionally distance themselves from their newborns. The practice of refraining from naming a child until it was certain that he or she would survive infancy was rare because of the belief in the continuation of family ties beyond the grave. Some even gave the dying messages to pass on to family members or friends who had died previously.

=== The "beautiful death" ===
The amount of firsthand exposure 19th-century Mormons had to death, namely the passing of immediate family members and close friends, fostered their participation in a cultural phenomenon known as the "beautiful death" or "holy death". This trend was popular among American Protestants, and was derived from customs first developed in medieval Christianity and the Church of England. Modern-day scholars also cite providentialism – the belief that God controlled the timing of deaths – as an original influence behind the "beautiful death" phenomenon. It involved a slow, dramatic deathbed scene during which loved ones gathered around to witness the person's transition into the next life. People believed that angels – particularly deceased ancestors – also attended these events, visible only to the dying. The person near death was to describe aloud a view of where they were headed. A gradual death in the presence of friends and family was of utmost importance; an abrupt, unplanned death without witnesses was seen as undesirable and, some believed, "could threaten salvation." Those confronting death sought to remain calm during their final hours and thereby display confidence in their ultimate fate. If they failed to do so, they risked losing a good position in the afterlife. As a whole, the process of a "beautiful death" was viewed by the early Latter Day Saints as a rite of passage necessary for salvation.

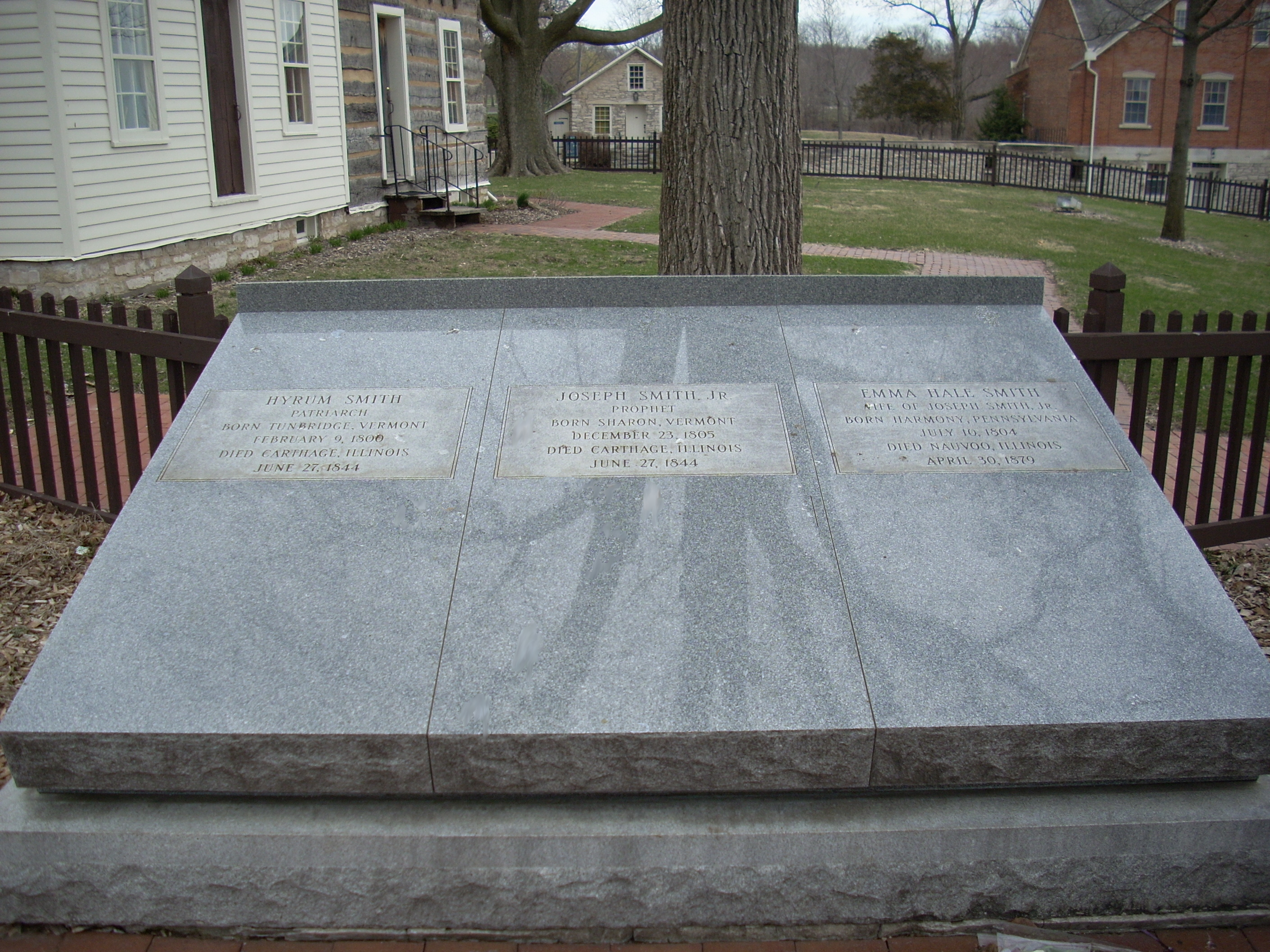
Grave of Joseph, Hyrum, and Emma Smith

There were three parties involved in the "beautiful death," each with a specific role to play: the dying had to appear convinced of their salvation, the living had to support the dying during their transition to the afterlife and mourn them once they departed, and the dead had to open the gates of heaven for the new soul once they arrived. All family members and friends were welcome; one's "beautiful death" could not be a private occurrence. The nearer the person grew to death, the more crowded the room became. This time was meant to be used to bequeath possessions and to give parting advice to one's children. Joseph Smith Sr. followed this convention; his wife Lucy Mack Smith recorded that, during his "beautiful death" scene, he blessed their children who were present and lamented the absence of a daughter who could not come. He expressed gratitude that his offspring were there to see him off. As Susanna Morrill, a professor of religion at Lewis & Clark College describes, the "beautiful death" scene was "a kind of tension-filled theater." Once the person died, the "beautiful death" tradition mandated that the body be buried in a cemetery near home. Proper burial was seen as an essential service to prepare the dead for the resurrection.

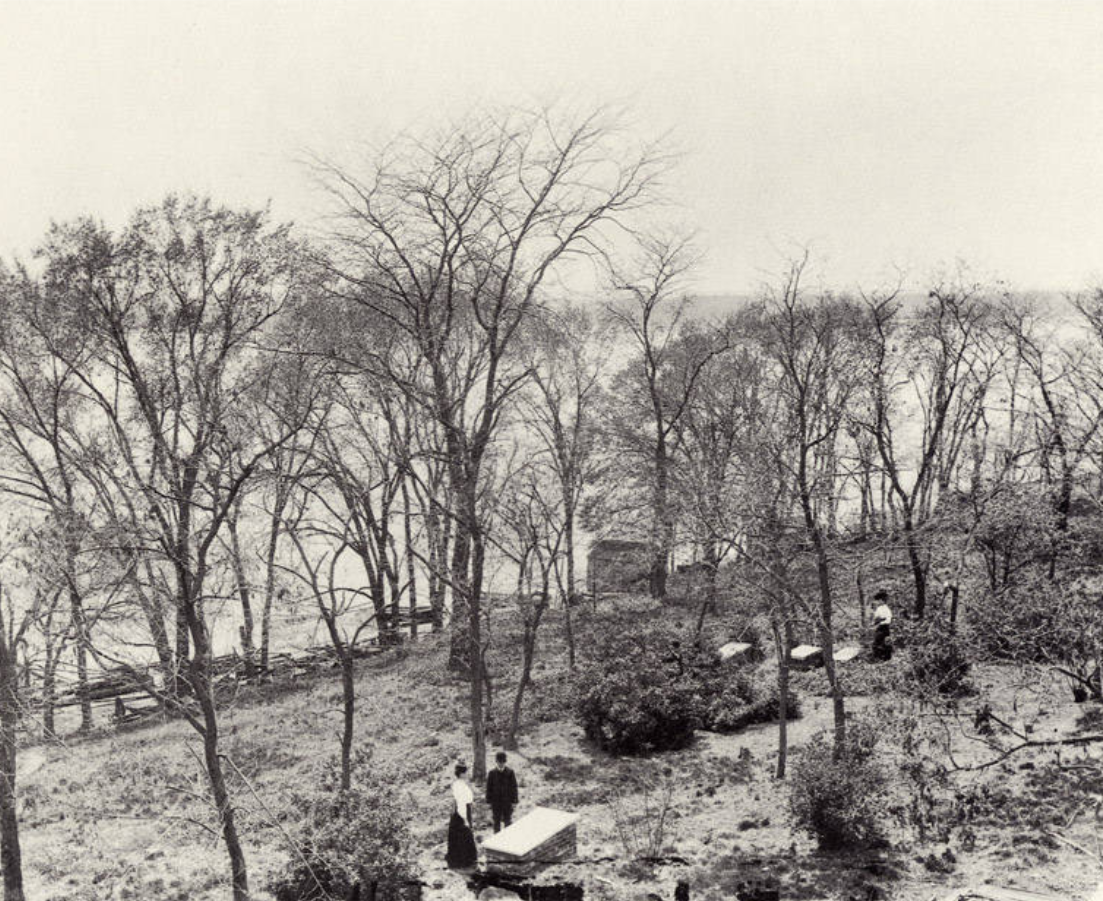
Smith Family Cemetery, Nauvoo, Illinois (ca. 1907)

== Burial and funeral ==
Latter Day Saints believed that "preserving the integrity of the body between death and resurrection" was necessary for salvation. Mormon pioneers, in the midst of their journey west, "respectfully and even reverently" buried their dead along the trail. Graves were blessed as "resting place[s] of the dead until the resurrection." Cemeteries were considered holy, and burial in such sites was extremely important to many Mormons. People wished for their loved ones to lie undisturbed. The bodies of Joseph and Hyrum Smith, for instance, were buried secretly in the basement of the Nauvoo House to protect them from mobs.

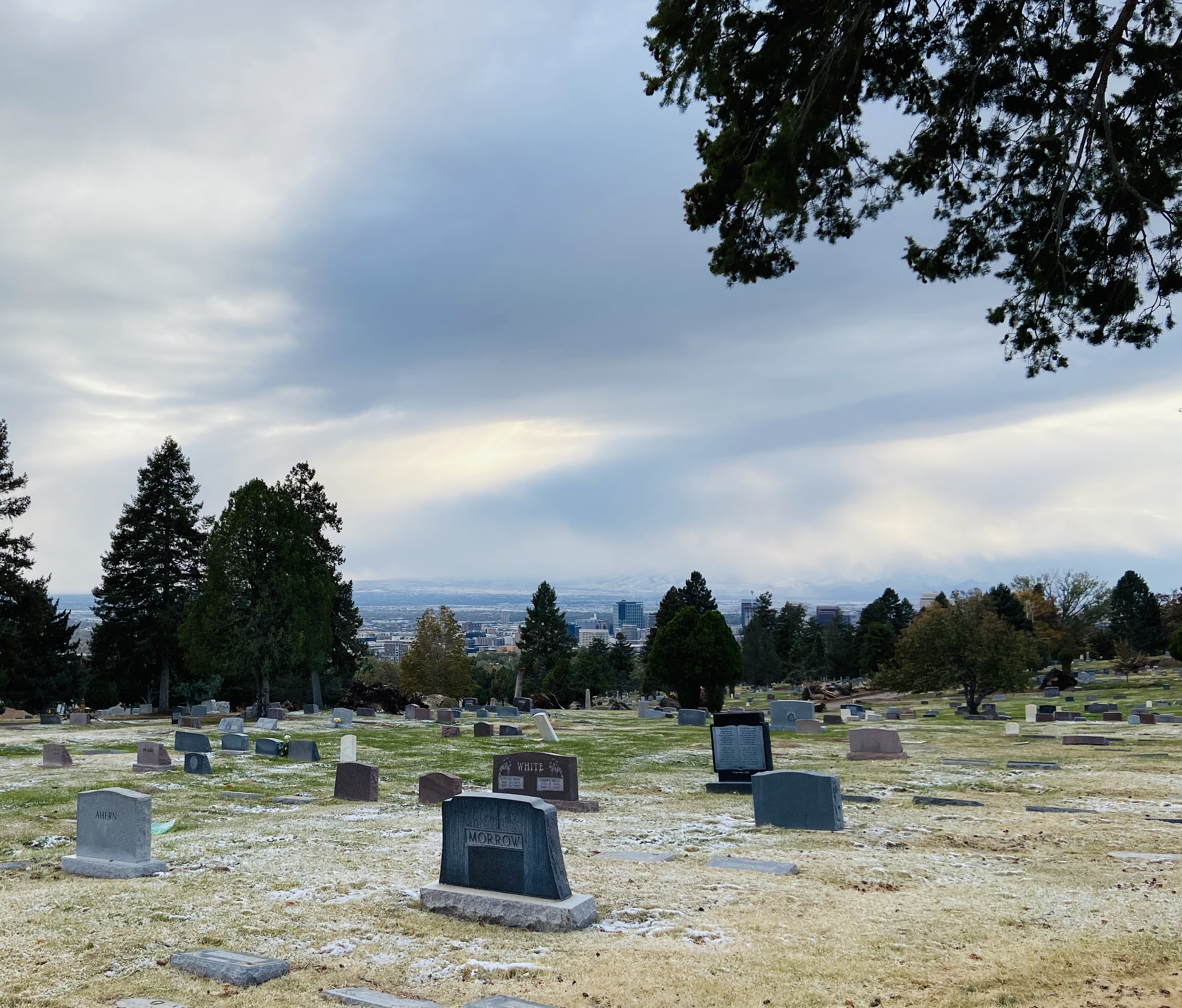
The Salt Lake City Cemetery

Once the pioneers reached the Salt Lake Valley, they designated block 49 in the new municipality of Salt Lake City as the first cemetery for members of the LDS Church in Utah Territory. Then, in 1849, George B. Wallace, Daniel H. Wells, and Joseph L. Heywood designated 20 acres of land in the nearby foothills as the Salt Lake City Cemetery. By order of an 1856 city ordinance, residents were required to be buried in the cemetery; but some families, fearing grave robbers, continued to bury loved ones on their own private property. Burial remained the main method of respecting the dead in Mormon culture throughout the 19th century, but some Latter-day Saints, beginning in 1877, were cremated. Joseph F. Smith taught that cremation would not interfere with the resurrection of the body in the afterlife, stating that "it is impossible to destroy a body … the time will come when every essential particle will be called back together again." Still, burial was encouraged by church leaders. Many desired to be buried alongside family members; Joseph Smith, for example, made plans to build a family sepulcher but died before completing the project. This "tomb of Joseph" was designed for the purpose of Smith and his family being together to witness "the morning of the first resurrection." Some early Latter-day Saints, however, opted to be buried with other people of the faith instead of their family members who had not joined the church.

=== Burial traditions and rituals ===
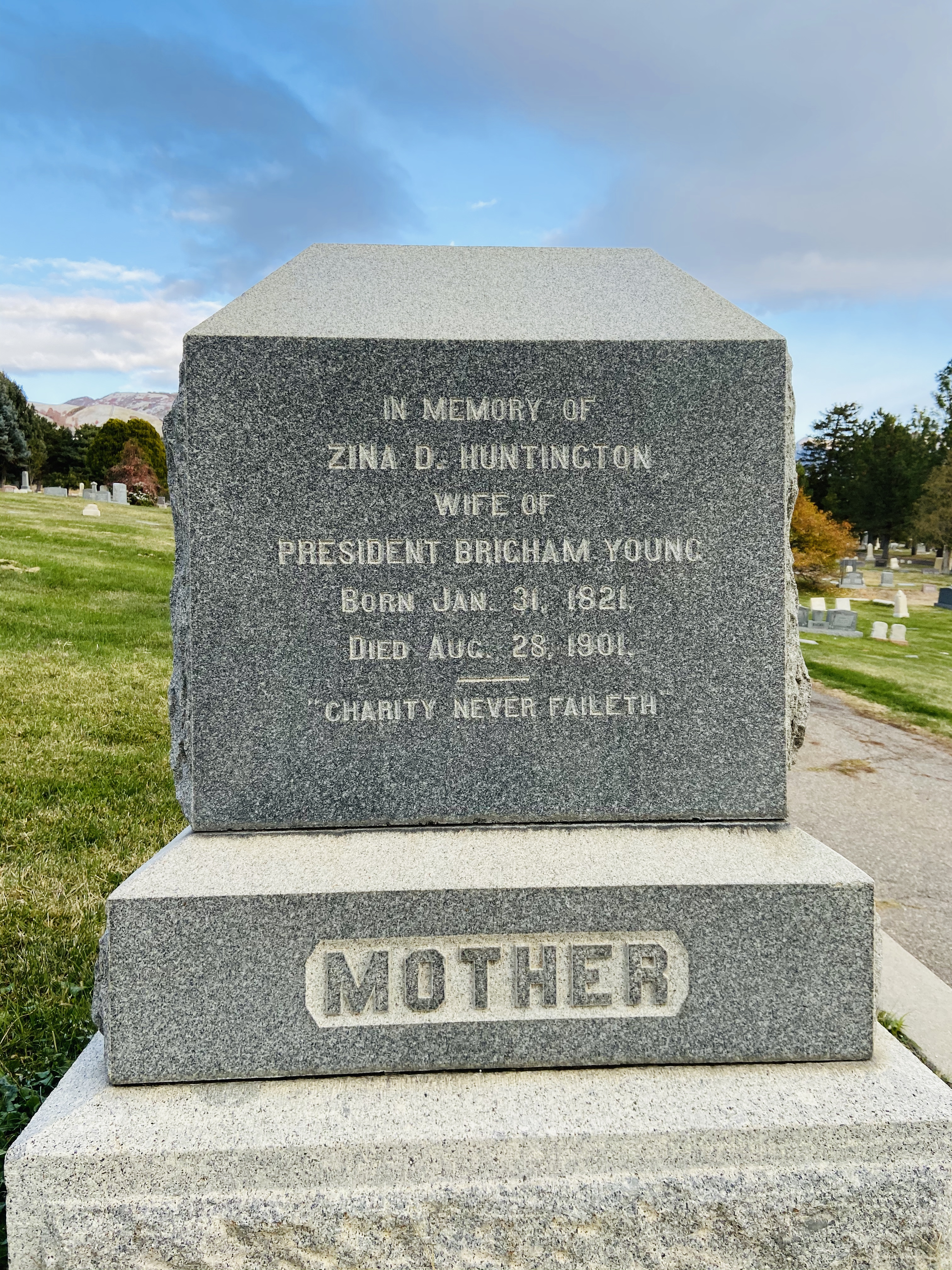
Grave of Zina D. H. Young, the third president of the Relief Society, at the Salt Lake City Cemetery

Burials were community efforts, and support from one's neighbors was not only customary, but expected. The Smith family, early in the century, played their part in the community of Palmyra, New York whenever a neighbor died by visiting the family of the deceased and consoling them. These social duties stemmed from a belief not only in family relationships being perpetuated beyond the grave but in entire communities of believers being united eternally. Because there were no professional morticians on the Utah frontier, Mormon women were in charge of washing and preparing bodies for burial. Knowledge and conventions pertaining to this task were passed down from mothers to daughters, from generation to generation; there was no official instruction from the church on how to care for the deceased. Latter-day Saints went to great lengths, sacrificing time and effort, to properly prepare the bodies of their fellow church members for interment. Duties were divided among the women who lived in the community of the deceased. They kept records of how many corpses they washed, dressed, and buried. Men assisted by washing and dressing the bodies of other men. Before embalming became available in the latter half of the 19th century, this assignment was time-sensitive; if the community waited too long to prepare the body for burial, it began to decay. Women remained involved in the process even after the arrival of mortuary science in Utah Territory, often by sewing burial clothes for the corpse. They continued to effectuate the more religious services as well; by that time, such rites had become an important part of Mormon culture.

Specific burial traditions were very important to Latter-day Saints in the 1800s; these included dressing the deceased in all white and, for mothers and babies that died during childbirth, placing the infant in the mother's arms. Corpses were laid in their graves facing east, so as to "meet Christ at his second coming." Having the person appear peaceful and organized while lying in his or her coffin was extremely important. Volunteers worked to make the body look beautiful so that the bereaved would be comforted when they saw their departed loved one at the viewing. Likewise, the most prominent Mormon death ritual delineated that endowed Latter Day Saints be dressed in their sacred temple clothing for burial. This practice began in Nauvoo, and evidence show that it was performed in Winter Quarters as well. Those who had not received the temple endowment were dressed in neat, white clothing. Whether or not the person was dressed appropriately was thought to have an effect on his or her ultimate fate. This practice was not, however, mandated by doctrine. Brigham Young instructed the Latter-day Saints that properly dressing endowed members for burial was important; but added that if for some reason, doing so proved to be impossible, the person would be dressed appropriately in the afterlife regardless. The Latter-day Saints wanted to show due respect to the dead so as to prevent the person accusing them of neglect in the afterlife. Usually, these key rituals were not publicly discussed in church settings. They were seen as holy and private. Women were mainly responsible for performing these death rituals. In this way, they were in charge of the transition of the spirit from its mortal body to the next life.

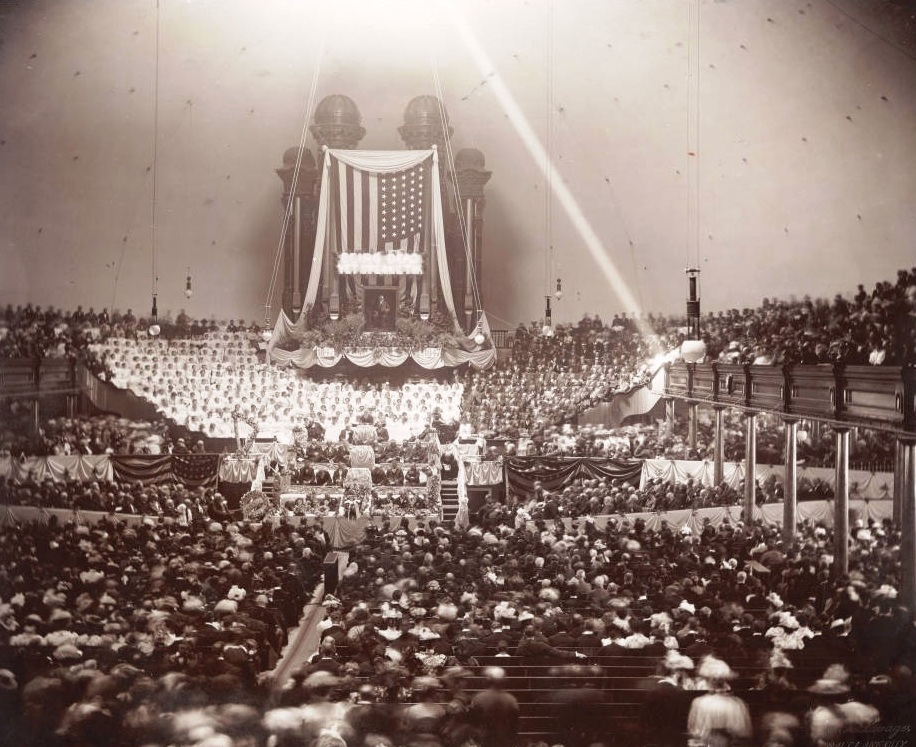
Wilford Woodruff's funeral in the Salt Lake Tabernacle in 1898

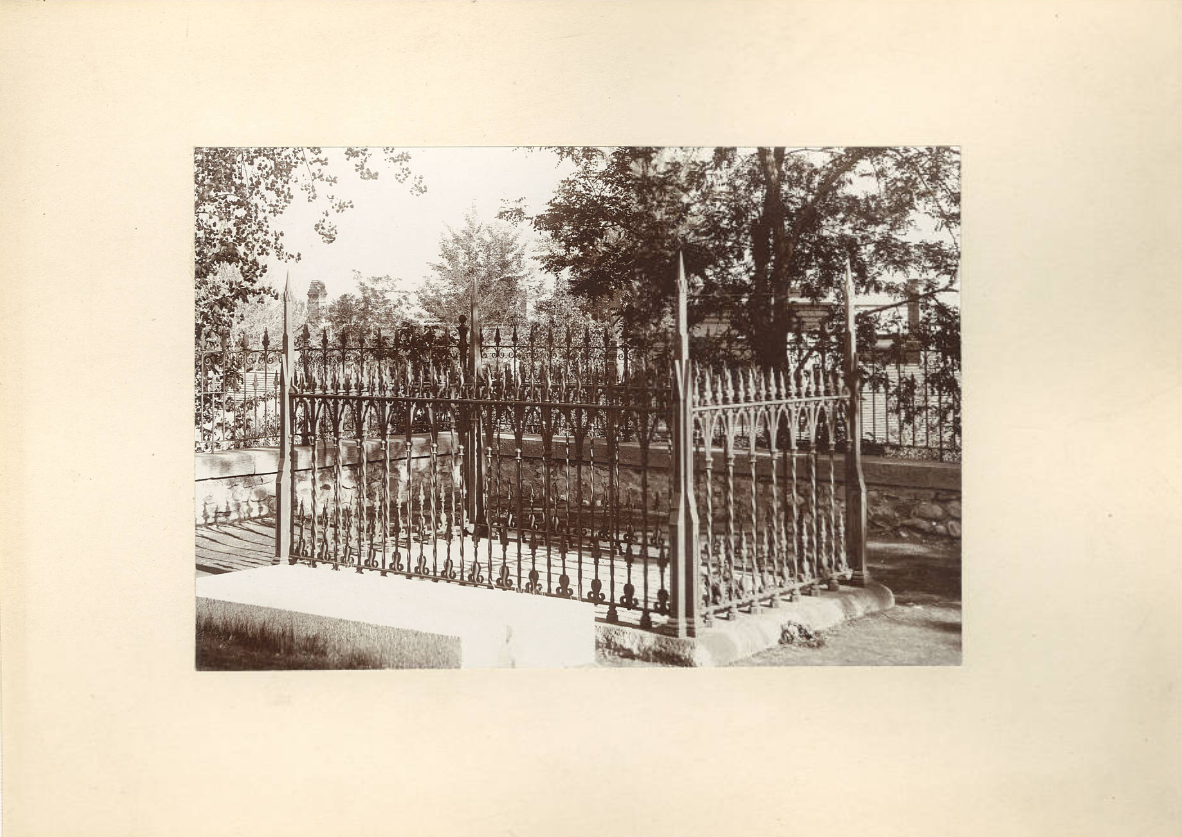
Gravesite of Brigham Young, photographed ca. 1880 by C. R. Savage, located in the Mormon Pioneer Memorial Monument in Salt Lake City, Utah

=== Funeral conventions ===
Predominant funeral traditions included processions and dedicatory prayers asking God to ensure the safety of the person's resting place. In these grave dedications, the deceased were addressed as though they were present. This practice was first documented in the 1870s. Like other LDS burial rituals, there were no official instructions from the church outlining how to perform grave dedications. Men possessing the priesthood usually said the dedicatory prayer, but other church members could effectuate this ritual as well. Stapley concludes that this tradition "began as [a] folk [ritual] with no explicit revelatory beginning." People gathered together to perform rites before, during, and after funerals, allowing the mourners to feel part of a larger whole of "faithful sufferers."

Local chapters of the Relief Society – the women's organization of the church – spearheaded the planning of funerals. They also provided services, including meals, for the person's family. At funerals, the community would join "at the church, home, or graveside to sing hymns, pray, and listen to sermons," mirroring common Protestant practices at the time. At Brigham Young's funeral, a new song composed for the occasion was sung by the mourners. They then accompanied the body to its grave, which was set "on a hill overlooking the [Salt Lake] valley." A wide array of church leaders were in attendance. Gerner's Weekly reported that Young had requested that his funeral attendees not be dressed in traditional mourning clothes. He also provided specific instructions for how his coffin was to be constructed, and explicitly stated that any of his friends or family who wanted to "say a few words" at his funeral be allowed to do so. Young's detailed outline set forth a standard of sorts for Latter-day Saint funerals after 1877. Wilford Woodruff gave similar instructions for his funeral, requesting that the attendees and decorators avoid the color black. This tradition continued for some time; beginning in 1888, the Salt Lake Tabernacle was decorated with white banners for funerals. Services were traditionally held on Sundays once preserving bodies became possible. On the whole, extravagant funerals were discouraged by church leadership. Most adhered to this counsel and held simple affairs to honor their dead, but thousands came to the funerals of well-known, revered general authorities. The First Presidency and Quorum of the Twelve Apostles were typically in attendance at such events.

==== Funeral sermons ====
Joseph Smith's teachings on the subject of death and the afterlife often took the form of funeral sermons, such as the King Follett discourse, which expanded Mormon eschatology to feature a "complex, highly structured immortal existence." In general, he used these opportunities to inspire his followers to study the afterlife extensively. For example, at the funeral of General James Adams, Smith taught: "All men know that all men must die. What is the object of our coming into existence, then dying and falling away to be here no more? This is a subject we ought to study more than any other, which we ought to study day and night." In another funeral sermon, he remarked that heaven for him would include not only his family but his entire community of believers. Smith's preaching on death, dying, and the eternal destiny of souls was often derived from his study of the Bible and Book of Mormon. Even in the days after Smith's death, funeral speakers usually included at least one man ordained to the Melchizedek priesthood.

The practice of delivering funeral sermons derived from Protestantism. Such speeches were simple, not ceremonial. Latter-day Saints commonly added a twist to this Protestant tradition by including language centered around the specifics of LDS doctrine and the traits of ideal believers. Mormon eulogies always included a reference to the continuity of a person's spirit after death, and often included proof of their "steadfastness and moral virtue." Speakers highlighted the most admirable qualities of the deceased to inspire obedience in the living. In addition to motivating the living to be righteous, sermons and eulogies simultaneously comforted the audience by assuring them of the subject's salvation. References to scripture, whether formally quoted or paraphrased, were almost always included as well. This included verses from the Bible, Book of Mormon, and Doctrine and Covenants. Popular funeral passages were easily recognized by Mormons at the time. Speakers placed various verses "in the context of the restored truths of an all-encompassing plan of salvation," emphasizing the eternal nature of family units. Quoting just the Book of Mormon and Doctrine and Covenants during funeral sermons became more common after 1850.

=== Mourning ===
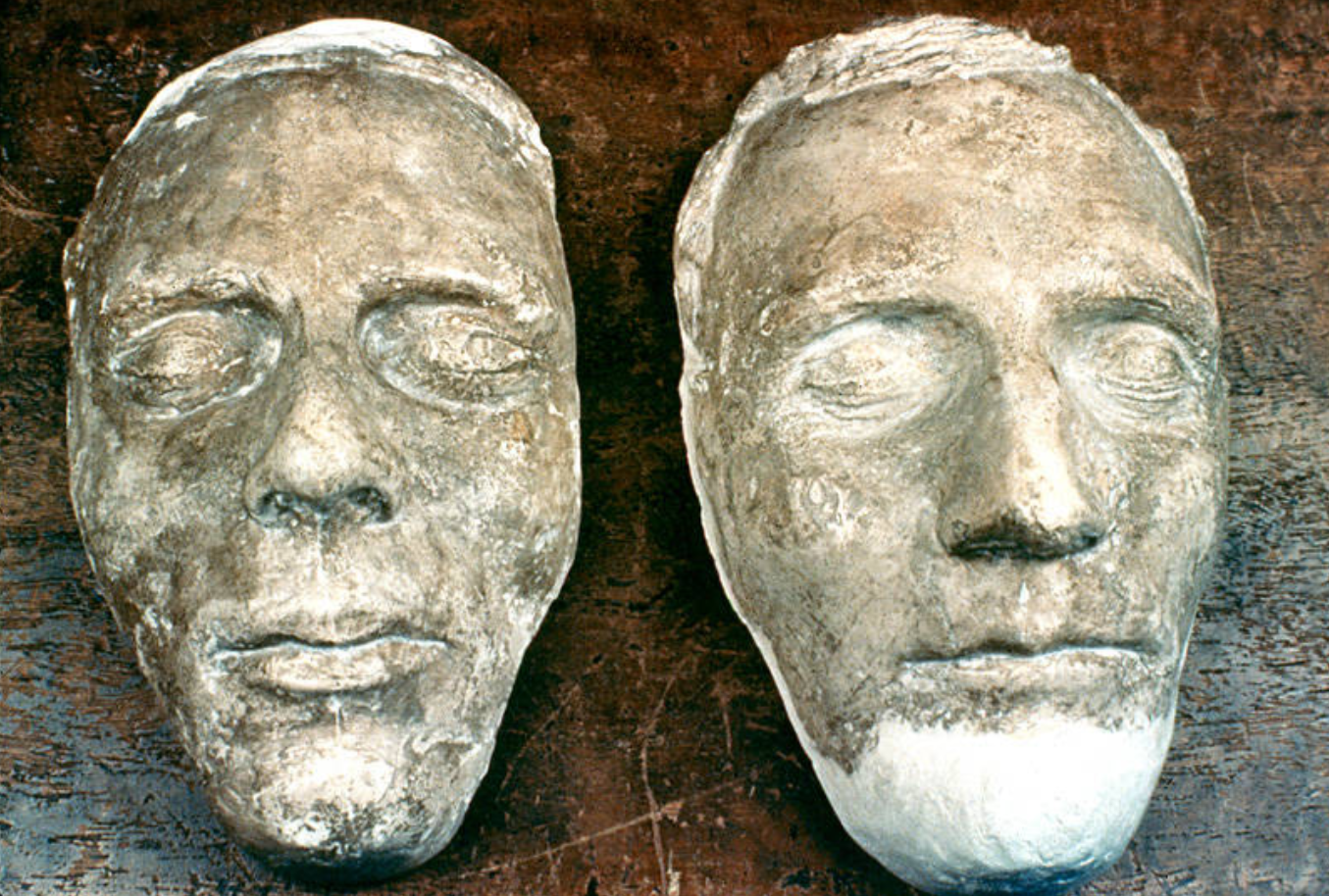
Death masks of Joseph (left) and Hyrum Smith (right), created in 1844

After a person died, the living entered into a period of intense mourning. Some even wished death upon themselves in the wake of the death of another. 19th-century Latter-day Saints were encouraged to bereave the dead, and often did so through eloquent obituaries in newspapers. Such passages usually told of the person's righteousness, the calm state they maintained while dying, and their last words. The potency of mourning, however, was not to exceed one's belief in God's wisdom and salvation for the believers. Brown wrote that, for these early church members, "mourning too much risked offending God and proving to outsiders that Mormonism had not solved the problem of death." Joseph Smith taught his followers that, during a time of mourning, their respect for God's will should overpower their love for departed family members and friends. By the turn of the century, the church officially discouraged the use of mourning clothes and cards.

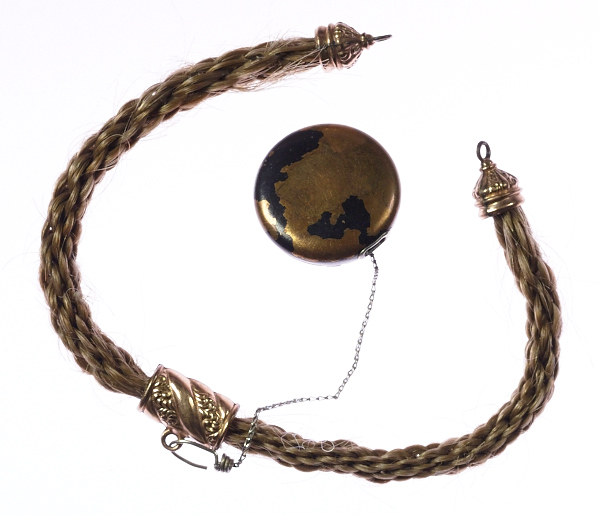
A human hair bracelet from the Zina Presendia Young Card collection at the L. Tom Perry Special Collections Library

==== Relics ====
Death masks, locks of hair, and canes made from the wood of coffins were kept as mementos of the deceased. These relics were believed to possess the power to protect the living from the devil and physical ailments. It was also a common practice to have an artist paint a portrait of the dead; if the family could not afford to hire a painter, they would remember their face through death masks made of plaster. These were extremely common before photography became widely available. George Q. Cannon made death masks of Joseph and Hyrum Smith using "layers of plaster and fabric strips" before the public viewing in Nauvoo, Illinois. Also in accordance with tradition at the time, multiple canes were made from Joseph's oak coffin and distributed among his friends. The possessors viewed these canes as sacred; Heber C. Kimball once remarked: "the devil cannot overcome those who have them, in consequence of their faith and confidence in the virtues connected with them." He also claimed that one had been used to heal a person. The one existing cane today contains a lock of Smith's hair in the handle.

==== Death poetry ====
While Mormon men expressed their grief by giving funeral sermons, their women counterparts turned to writing death poems both to feel community support and experience a sort of private catharsis. The death poetry found in 19th-century editions of the Woman's Exponent, a periodical published by and for LDS women, reflected the fascination with death frequently found in Victorian culture. It also reaffirms the commonality of death at the time. Of the 400 poems published in the Woman's Exponent during its first decade of existence, 67 directly discussed death. Instead of focusing on the perpetuity of life, LDS death poems often depicted departed souls as being at rest or simply asleep. Others cited LDS doctrine as a source of hope. Some authors expressed terrible pain or even the desire to join their loved ones in death.

== Afterlife ==
=== Eschatology ===
Mormon theology painted a desirable picture of the afterlife for the faithful. Both Brigham Young and Orson Pratt taught about the afterlife extensively. The eschatological teachings of church leaders in the 19th century often contrasted those of contemporary Protestantism. Instead of promulgating the hellfire and damnation that awaited sinners, Mormons taught that those who were unfaithful while on earth faced an uncertain – though not automatically terrible – afterlife. Klaus J. Hansen writes: "According to Mormonism only those few who had committed the unpardonable sins of shedding innocent blood, or of denying the Holy Ghost, would suffer the kind of tortures that Puritans believed would be meted out to most mortals." Latter Day Saints predicted that all people who had ever existed on earth would become immortal. Joseph Smith directly taught that Jesus Christ's sacrifice granted all people resurrection to an immortal life, wherein the righteous would enjoy living alongside God the Father. Additionally, in 1832, he revealed the doctrine of degrees of glory, which defined three levels of heaven. Under this model, even the unrighteous would "receive a heavenly reward." However, Mormons also believed that baptism at the hands of someone holding the proper authority – found only in the church – was necessary for salvation; so, many expressed anxiety for their loved ones who had not yet joined the faith. Thus, Mormon eschatology combined the "certainty of orthodox Calvinism" with "the Arminian opportunities for humans to collaborate with divine grace" to produce a sort of middle ground. For instance, Mormons held the belief that children who died before the "age of accountability" – eight years of age – would be "saved in the Celestial Kingdom of heaven" automatically. Multiple passages in the Book of Mormon reasserted this doctrine to the Latter Day Saints. Additionally, Book of Mormon teachings such as the story of the Three Nephites asserted that some believers would "never taste of death" but instead live on the earth until the Second Coming of Jesus Christ. Some early Mormons believed that those who were faithful enough – even in modern times – could be translated. For some, this signified the future translation of the entire city of Zion.

The afterlife was viewed by Mormons as both a place of rest and a place to hurriedly continue the work of salvation. Departed souls were believed to be tasked with sharing Latter Day Saint teachings with those who had not heard or accepted them on earth. Wilford Woodruff once described a vision of Joseph Smith laboring to teach in the spirit world, the post-mortal realm which Mormons believed to house the souls of all the deceased who had ever walked the earth. Brigham Young taught that, at their time of death, a person's soul departed from the mortal body, and their pain would be vanquished. Both Young and Smith taught that the "spirit" was made of a different, otherworldly substance - one more "refined" than that of the physical body. This teaching was inspired by verses in the Book of Mormon. The Book of Abraham also provided key information about the nature of the afterlife and the eventual destiny of the human race. After Joseph Smith's time, LDS leaders taught that death was a painless, pleasing process through which people traveled to a world much more joyful and beautiful than earth. This "spirit realm" would be filled with plants, animals, and one's own family members. As time went on, the Mormon eschatological doctrine progressed. Through church conferences and publications, Latter-day Saints learned more specific details about the afterlife. It was taught that, when a person died, their mortal afflictions and restrictions would be lost; the capacity to see and hear, for example, would be expanded. As spirits, they would still be able to communicate with others and observe their surroundings through the five senses.

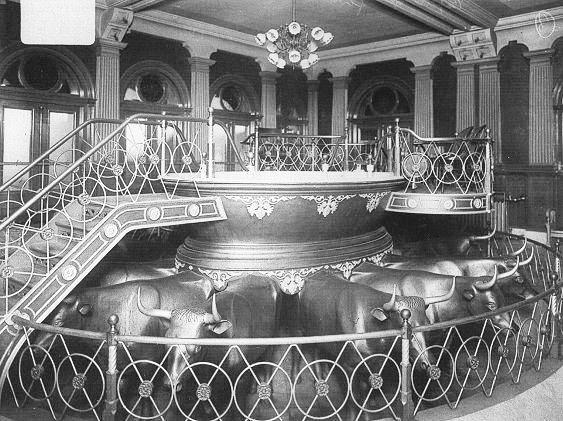
Baptismal font in the Salt Lake Temple, used for baptisms for the dead

=== Death and temple rites ===
On August 15, 1840, Smith introduced the doctrine of baptism for the dead, which taught that baptisms could be performed vicariously for those who had died previously. The dead, in turn, could either "accept or decline [the] baptism" performed for them by living believers. According to Smith, all people needed baptism in order to be cleansed of sin and to be saved. In conjunction with this revealed doctrine, he stressed that one's own salvation was directly connected to that of their ancestors. This was a stepping stone towards the "new and everlasting covenant" of marriage, which Smith revealed on July 12, 1843. This assured families that their relationships were preserved in the afterlife "if sealed by the proper priesthood authorities." It also eased the widespread heartache among the Latter Day Saints brought on by high infant mortality rates. This eternal sealing of husbands and wives, along with other temple ordinances such as the endowment, encouraged faithful Latter Day Saints that they could conquer death and alleviated stress concerning the post-mortal fate of loved ones. Smith eventually taught that these rituals were necessary for exaltation. Temple ordinances further advanced Mormon eschatology as the religion grew to maturity. It thus became "a comprehensive religious and social movement that addressed itself to the fundamental problems confronting mankind," providing believers with answers to questions about their destiny after death.

=== Near-death experiences ===
In the LDS Church in the 19th century, near-death experiences were often recorded, and commonly shared. Joseph Smith deemed some of these encounters "precious morsels from heaven." Multiple near-death experiences recorded by early Mormons harmonized with Smith's teachings of the afterlife. A few claimed to have seen Smith, his brother Hyrum, or Brigham Young in the "spirit world." Some near-death experiences were published in magazines such as the Juvenile Instructor. Additionally, the Elders' Journal, Relief Society Magazine, and Improvement Era printed the near-death experiences of church leaders such as George Albert Smith, Jacob Hamblin, and George Brimhall.

Modern near-death experiences share many similarities with those recorded in the 1800s by Mormons. Five pre-1864 accounts convey similar details, including: "happiness, no pain, entering the light, meeting others, encounters with deceased loved ones, [a] sense of well-being, world of light, making the decision [to return to life], and coming back." In addition, some corroborate things taught by 19th-century leaders of the LDS Church, such as the quick movement of post-mortal beings and increased intellectual ability after death. Some also reflect Parley P. Pratt and Orson Pratt's teaching of there being a new, otherworldly method of communication in the afterlife.

== See also ==
- Christian eschatology
- Spiritual death in Christianity
- Mormon folklore
- Culture of the LDS Church
