= William A. Wilson (folklorist) =

American scholar of Mormon folklore (1933–2016)

- Born: William Albert Wilson; September 23, 1933; Tremonton, Utah
- Died: April 26, 2016 (aged 82); Provo, Utah
- Other name: Bert Wilson
- Known for: Mormon folklore
- Awards: Utah Governor's Award in the Arts, 1998 Leonard J. Arrington Award, Mormon History Association, 2002; Américo Paredes Award, American Folklore Society The Aimo Turunen Medal from the Kalevala Society of Finland

Academic background
- Education: Indiana University; Brigham Young University
- Thesis: Folklore and Nationalism in Modern Finland (1974)
- Doctoral advisor: Felix J. Oinas

Academic work
- Discipline: Mormon folklore
- Institutions: Utah State University; Brigham Young University

William Albert "Bert" Wilson (September 23, 1933 – April 25, 2016) was a scholar of Mormon folklore. The "father of Mormon folklore" helped found and organize folklore archives at both Utah State University (USU) and Brigham Young University (BYU). He directed the folklore archive at USU from 1978 to 1985, and chaired the English department at BYU from 1985 to 1991. He and his students collected jokes, legends, stories, songs, and other information to add to the Mormon folklore archives.

== Early life and education ==
William Albert Wilson was born in Tremonton, Utah, to Bill Wilson, who worked as a railroad foreman for Union Pacific, and Lucile Wilson. He grew up in Downey, Idaho, a small, close-knit community. He was best friends with Eugene England. He became the first of his family to attend university when he enrolled at Brigham Young University (BYU) in 1951. He served a mission for the Church of Jesus Christ of Latter-day Saints in Finland in 1953.

While in Finland, he gained an appreciation for Finnish culture, especially the collection of epic poetry, The Kalevala. As a missionary, he met Hannele Blomqvist who was serving as a sister missionary. They studied at BYU together and were married in the Salt Lake Temple on May 31, 1957. They had four children together.

After teaching English for a year at Bountiful High School, Wilson completed an MA in English from BYU. His friend and colleague Robert Blair suggested that he study folklore at Indiana University because of the good reputation of the school's Central Eurasian folklore program. At first his interest in folklore was unenthusiastic, but he soon became immersed in his studies.

Wilson earned a National Defense Language Scholarship, which helped fund his studies at Indiana University. Under the scholarship, he studied Estonian and Finnish. From 1965 to 1966, Wilson received a Fulbright grant to study in the cultural history of Finland. He studied in the library of the Finnish Literature Society, taking special interest in the German philosopher Johann Gottfried Herder's idea that the soul of a culture could be seen through its folklore. Richard Dorson, the director of folklore studies and Wilson's mentor, approved Wilson's dissertation topic, which was the political use of The Kalevala to instill nationalism. Felix J. Oinas chaired Wilson's dissertation committee.

In 1967, Wilson resumed teaching at BYU and developed thyroid cancer, undergoing five surgeries to keep the cancer at bay. In 1973, he took a leave of absence from BYU to complete his dissertation in 1974.

== Mormon folklore research and outreach ==
Wilson discovered Mormon folklore studies when he reviewed Saints of Sage and Saddle by Austin E. and Alta S. Fife for a class, and took an interest in Mormon folklore. He wrote an article on Three Nephites stories in 1969, surprising Dorson with his ability to collect Mormon folklore in Indiana, outside of the Mountain states. In his later research on the Three Nephites, Wilson stated that the persistence of the stories showed how Mormons believe in a personal and benevolent God. While at first Wilson focused on supernatural tales and legends, he worked to extend folklore studies in Mormondom to include everyday life.

Wilson wrote dozens of articles on Mormon folklore, covering topics like Mormon humor, Mormon missionaries, the portrayal of minority groups among Mormons, and family folklore. In his analysis of Mormon folklore, he finds that it usually supports certain behaviors and authority, but allows for the possibility of rebellion. He said that folklore changes as it is passed between members to reflect the needs of the people telling it. The stories become "psychologically true" even if they did not happen in fact.

Wilson revitalized the Folklore Society of Utah in the 1970s by holding meetings with the Utah State Historical Society. He gave lectures to various societies and "anyone who would listen" about the importance of folklore studies. From 1976 to 1984, Wilson chaired the Folk Arts Panel on the Board of the Utah Arts Council. He served on the National Endowment for the Arts Folk Arts Panel for four years in the 1980s, during which he applied for and received funding for an annual Cowboy Poetry Gathering in Elko, Nevada. Wilson was the Director of the Redd Center for Western Studies, and in 1990 he received the title of Humanities Professor of Folklore and Literature. He edited Western Folklore from 1979 to 1983, with the goal of publishing articles that the average college student could understand. He taught many current Mormon folklorists, and a recent book on Mormon folklore was dedicated to him.

== Developing Mormon folklore archives ==
Wilson worked as the director of the folklore program and archives at Utah State University from 1978 to 1985, expanding and formalizing the collection that Austin E. and Alta S. Fife started. While working as director of the archive, he and Barbara Walker (then Garrett) established a taxonomy for archiving folk materials, which he developed from Jan Harold Brunvand's system printed in The Study of American Folklore. Wilson's new system is infinitely expandable, allowing for additional classifications within classifications. Wilson also worked to expand undergraduate courses, and helped to enable a new master's program: American studies with an emphasis in folklore. While working at Utah State University, Wilson directed the Fife Folklore Conference, which was becoming more and more popular.

Wilson chaired the English department at BYU from 1985 to 1991. When he returned to BYU in 1985, he began organizing a new folklore archive, using the method he had developed at Utah State University. The archive began with papers that students wrote for Wilson, John Sorenson, an anthropologist, and Thomas E. Cheney, another folklorist. The collection's papers report on legends, beliefs, jokes, songs, and material culture popular with Mormons and/or in the Intermountain West. The first permanent archivist was hired in 1995, and the collection became part of the Harold B. Lee Library's collection when Wilson retired. In 1999, the collection officially became part of the L. Tom Perry Special Collections division of the library, and is called the William A. Wilson Folklore Archives.

== Selected works ==
- "The Study of Mormon Folklore". Utah Historical Quarterly. 44 (4). 1976.
- "In Praise of Ourselves: Stories to Tell". BYU Studies. 44 (4). Fall 1976.
- with Poulsen, Richard C. (Nov–Dec 1980). "The Curse of Cain and Other Stories: Blacks in Mormon Folklore". Sunstone. 5 (6).
- On Being Human: The Folklore of Mormon Missionaries. Logan, Utah: Utah State University Press. 1981.
- "Freeways, Parking Lots, and Ice Cream Stands: The Three Nephites in Contemporary Society" (PDF). Dialogue. 21 (3): 15–27. 1988.
- "The Study of Mormon Folklore: An Uncertain Mirror for Truth" (PDF). Dialogue. 22 (4). 1989.
- Brunvand, Jan Harold, ed. (1996). "Mormon Folklore". American folklore: an encyclopedia. New York: Garland Publ. ISBN 978-0815307518.
- Wilson, William A. (2006). Rudy, Jill Terry (ed.). The Marrow of Human Experience: Essays on Folklore by William A. Wilson. University Press of Colorado. doi:10.2307/j.ctt4cgkmk. ISBN 9780874216530. JSTOR j.ctt4cgkmk.

== Awards and honors ==
- Fellow, American Folklore Society
- Fellow, Utah State Historical Society
- Karl G. Maeser Distinguished Scholar, 1990
- Utah Governor's Award in the Arts, 1998
- Leonard J. Arrington Award, Mormon History Association, 2002
- Américo Paredes Award, American Folklore Society
- High honors, Finnish government and Finnish Literature Society
- Charles Redd Award from the Utah Academy of Sciences, Arts, and Letters
- The Aimo Turunen Medal from the Kalevala Society of Finland
