= Three Nephites =

Figures in LDS mythology

In the Book of Mormon, the Three Nephites (also known as the Three Nephite Disciples) are three Nephite disciples of Jesus who were blessed by Jesus to remain alive on the earth, engaged in his ministry and in their apostolic callings until his Second Coming. As described in Third Nephi chapter 28, this change occurred when they were caught up into heaven. Similar to LDS beliefs about John the Apostle, the Three Nephites were granted immortality in order to carry out their ministering work on the earth. The account in the Book of Mormon reads that they ministered unto all the people in the surrounding lands, bringing many to the church by means of preaching and baptism.

In modern times, the Three Nephites and the beliefs surrounding them make up a significant part of LDS folklore. These stories describe situations in which the Three Nephites have appeared and provided assistance in some way or another to church members, and such stories give insight into the contemporary tests of faith experienced by members of The Church of Jesus Christ of Latter-day Saints (LDS Church).

== Origin ==
The Three Nephites were chosen from among Christ's twelve disciples on the American continent. Of the twelve, nine expressed their desire to enter speedily into Christ's kingdom once their earthly missions were completed, and Christ granted their wish. The remaining three wanted to remain on the earth laboring in the cause of Christ until his Second Coming, a wish which he granted unto them upon his departure into heaven. He then left them with a blessing that they would not taste of death, and that upon his Second Coming they would be changed from mortality to immortality. Jesus promised them that they would experience no pain or sorrow during their time on earth, wickedness would have no power over them, and they would possess knowledge and wisdom exceeding that of a mortal human perspective. The so-called Three Nephites are referred to only as "disciples", and it is possible that one or more of them were Lamanites by descent. However, it was standard practice in the Book of Mormon to refer to Lamanites who were converted to the faith as Nephites.

=== Ministry ===
The prophet Mormon, who lived about four hundred years after the Three Nephites, identified a few major groups that the Three Nephites would minister to and recounted his encounter with them. They would first labor among the faithful Nephites and Lamanites who remained after the appearance of Christ on the American continent. Then they would minister to the Gentiles, the Jews, the scattered tribes of Israel, and all nations, kindreds, tongues, and people. Similar to other stories about missionaries and martyrs, the text says that they suffered severe persecution from those who did not believe. In the centuries that followed Christ's visit to the Americas, as faith decreased among the inhabitants and persecution increased, the Three Nephites were "taken away" from the people for a time. Later chapters of the Book of Mormon indicate that they were placed once again among the people to continue their ministry and work. Mormon wrote that he himself had been visited by the Three Nephites, and that they had ministered to him. Mormon also wrote that they would be among the Jews and the Gentiles, and the Jews and Gentiles shall not recognize them. Mormon stated that he intended to write the names of the Three Nephites, but God forbade him to do so. Mormon also wrote that the Three Nephites were cast into prison, buried alive, thrown into a furnace and into a den of wild beasts, but emerged unharmed on each of these occasions because of the powers Christ had endowed them with.

== Orson Pratt's speculation ==
Orson Pratt, a member of the Quorum of the Twelve Apostles of the church, drew attention to the account of the Three Nephites while speaking at a conference in Salt Lake City in 1855, and alluded to the possibility that the three men might still be upon the earth:

Do you suppose that these three Nephites have any knowledge of what is going on in this land? They know all about it; they are filled with the spirit of prophecy. Why do they not come into our midst? Because the time has not come. Why do they not lift up their voices in the midst of our congregations? Because there is a work for us to do preparatory to their reception, and when that is accomplished, they will accomplish their work, unto whomsoever they desire to minister. If they shall pray to the Father, says the Book of Mormon, in the name of Jesus, they can show themselves unto whatsoever person or people they choose. The very reason they do not come amongst us is, because we have a work to do preparatory to their coming; and just as soon as that is accomplished they are on hand, and also many other good old worthy ancients that would rejoice our hearts could we behold their countenances, and hear them recite over the scenes they have passed through, and the history of past events, as well as prophecy of the events to come.

Following Pratt's talk, church members who had experiences with unidentified messengers began to identify such visitors as being one, two, or all three of the Three Nephites. A study published in 1947 found that, out of seventy-five recorded appearances of the Three Nephites, only six occurred before 1855. Various other church leaders began to make mention of the Nephites in their talks and discourses, and the legend grew among members across the settlements.

== Folklore ==
The story surrounding the Three Nephites began to capture the attention of the outside world near the end of the 19th century, when it was mentioned in The Folk-Lorist, the journal of the Chicago Folk-Lore Society, in an article written by Reverend David Utter of Salt Lake City in 1892 about Mormon superstitions. The origin story of the Three Nephites and their subsequent sightings were later mentioned in various journals and publications throughout the 20th century. As with all Mormon folkloric stories, the tale of the Three Nephites spread quickly throughout the world, given the growing global missionary presence.

Three Nephite folklore has been studied by folklorists William A. Wilson, David Utter, Wayland Hand, Hector Lee, Austin E. and Alta S. Fife, and Richard Dorson. Many similarities have been found between the story of the Three Nephites and those of John the Beloved and the Wandering Jew, as well as various other spiritual leaders who have been awarded the privilege to never taste of death. The folklore and beliefs about the Three Nephite stem from a larger church-wide folklore generated by belief in a personal, loving God who actively intervenes in people's lives, often by the means of others.

In her 1968 thesis, Merilynne Rich Smith wrote the following about Three Nephite folklore:

In addition, [the stories have] become a type of history of the life of Mormons. During times of famine, the stories stressed the need for food; during times of danger, they revealed the problems the Saints faced; and at the same time they provide inspiration for those facing future problems of a similar nature. They offer evidence of divine concern for men here on earth. They provide a testimony for those who are weak in faith. They provide a way to explain the things which are sometimes inexplicable.

Folklorist William A. Wilson collected Three Nephites stories and organized them into three categories. In family history or genealogy stories, one of the Three Nephites guides a family history researcher to missing information or encourages them to do their temple work and miraculously disappears. In the missionary work category of stories, one of the Three Nephites saves a missionary companionship from danger or helps with their proselytizing work. In the individual category, one of the Three Nephites saves a person from spiritual or physical danger or despair. Three Nephites stories have not stopped, even though the perils of pioneer life have. The Three Nephites stories mirror the changing physical and social environments in which LDS church members have met their tests of faith. As with other types of religious folklore, these stories continue to provide understanding of the hearts and minds of LDS church members and of the beliefs that compel them to action. They have a flexibility that allows them to be adapted to situations and circumstances, which has allowed them to persist throughout the years. They can be used and customized to prove any number of points, whether religious or not.

=== Common themes ===
A common theme in folklore of the Church of Jesus Christ of Latter-day Saints is when spirits return to help the living in some way. The Three Nephites tale fits into this story type, and it was not uncommon of early church members to share their own experiences, or those of others, of appearances of the Three Nephites. In these modern sighting stories, one or more of the Nephites appear to aid those in need before miraculously disappearing. The Three Nephites provide a range of assistance, from protecting missionaries and children faced with danger to more domestic tasks like plowing fields, or fixing a widow's furnace. In his 1947 dissertation, Hector Lee classified one hundred-fifty accounts of Three Nephite sightings according to a few major motifs, largely dealing with the purpose of their appearances. There are those involving food (a motif especially common in pioneer times when food was scarce), healing, delivery of a divine message or provision of spiritual uplift, assistance to those engaged in missionary work, and rescue. Another common motif Lee mentions is the speed at which they travel, as they are reported to cover great distances in very little time, and the suddenness with which they are able to appear and disappear.

== In Mormon art ==
=== Literature ===
- "The Giant of Washington Flatt" by Juanita Brooks, in which a young boy leads his neighborhood to believe that the Three Nephites have visited them.
- The Giant Joshua by Maurine Whipple, a popular novel detailing polygamy and pioneer life in Utah's Dixie.
- A House of Many Rooms by Rodello Hunter, telling the story of an early Mormon family.
- "Sanctified, in the Flesh" by Brian Evenson, in which a Mormon couple is held up, robbed, and eventually murdered by three men whom they mistakenly believe to be the Three Nephites.
- "American Trinity" by David G. Pace, which interprets the story of the Three Nephites in modern times, narrated by one of the three who has grown weary of his calling and lost his faith.
- "Parables from the New World" by Todd Robert Petersen
- "Garden of Legion" by David J. West
- "The Last Nephite" by Neil Chandler
- "They Did Go Forth" by Maurine Whipple, telling the story of a woman and her sick child who were visited by one of the Three Nephites, at the same time as her husband on an LDS church mission in England.
- "The Third Nephite" by Levi Peterson, the story of a man who is urged by one of the Three Nephites to abandon his newfound fundamentalist beliefs.
- "Wild Sage" by Phyllis Barber, in which a mother agonizing over her decision to keep her son's secret is visited and consoled by the Three Nephites.
- Tennis Shoes Adventure Series by Chris Heimerdinger
- "Christina" by Angela Hallstrom, a pioneer ancestry story taking place in the 19th century.

=== Comics ===
- Madman by Mike Allred

=== Film ===
- Baptists at Our Barbecue: the Three Nephites are portrayed as three mechanics in spotless, white coveralls in two scenes (one scene is only noticeable through listening to the DVD commentary)
- Jer3miah

== See also ==
- Translation (LDS Church)
- Mormon folklore
- Wandering Jew
- Ashwatthama
