= Merrill–Cazier Library =

Merrill-Cazier Library
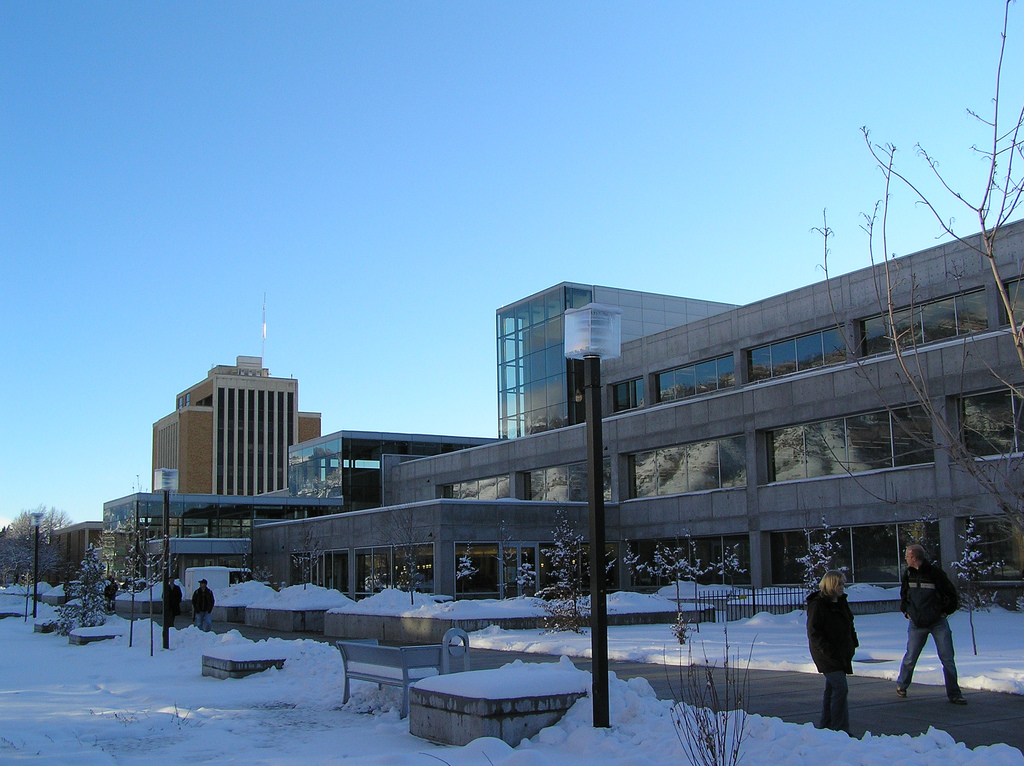
- 41°44′32″N 111°48′34″W
- Location: Utah State University; Logan, Utah, United States
- Type: Academic
- Established: 2005

Collection
- Size: 1.59 million print volumes

Access and use
- Population served: campus and surrounding area

Other information
- Director: Bradford Cole
- Website: http://library.usu.edu

The Merrill–Cazier Library is an academic library serving the students of Utah State University and the community of Logan, Utah.

== History ==
The Merrill–Cazier Library opened in September 2005. The building integrated the Cazier Science and Technology Library with a 189,000-square-foot (17,600 m^{2}) expansion, replacing the 74-year-old Merrill Library. The library is named for Milton R. Merrill, former Utah State University vice president, and Stanford Cazier, former Utah State University president.

The original Merrill Library was built in 1930 by the Whitmeyer Company of Ogden, Utah and expanded in 1967.

A second library, the Cazier Science and Technology Library, was added to campus in 1995. Designed by John M.Y. Lee and Michael Timchula Architects in New York, NY. The atrium was built around the Dale Eldred installation piece, "08 Light and Time Incident."

The library had a much larger 190,000 square foot addition built starting in 2003-designed by EHDD Architecture of San Francisco, CA.

The Merrill–Cazier Library recently marked its 100th anniversary as a regional United States Government document depository.

== The Building ==
A central atrium connects the former Cazier Science and Technology library with the new construction allowing the two to work as one. The library is 305,000-square-foot (28,300 m^{2}), about the same as the previous two libraries combined, using technological innovations, the new library is a more functional building.

The library was labeled as a "Smart Library" by Campus Technology magazine in 2006, as the Merrill–Cazier Library offers a technology-rich environment with radio frequency identification tags (RFID), a self check-out system, an on site automated retrieval system, the Information Commons consisting of 150 computer workstations, group study rooms of which 14 are equipped with computers and large screen LCD displays, two multimedia suites, and two library instruction rooms with over 60 workstations.

== BARN ==
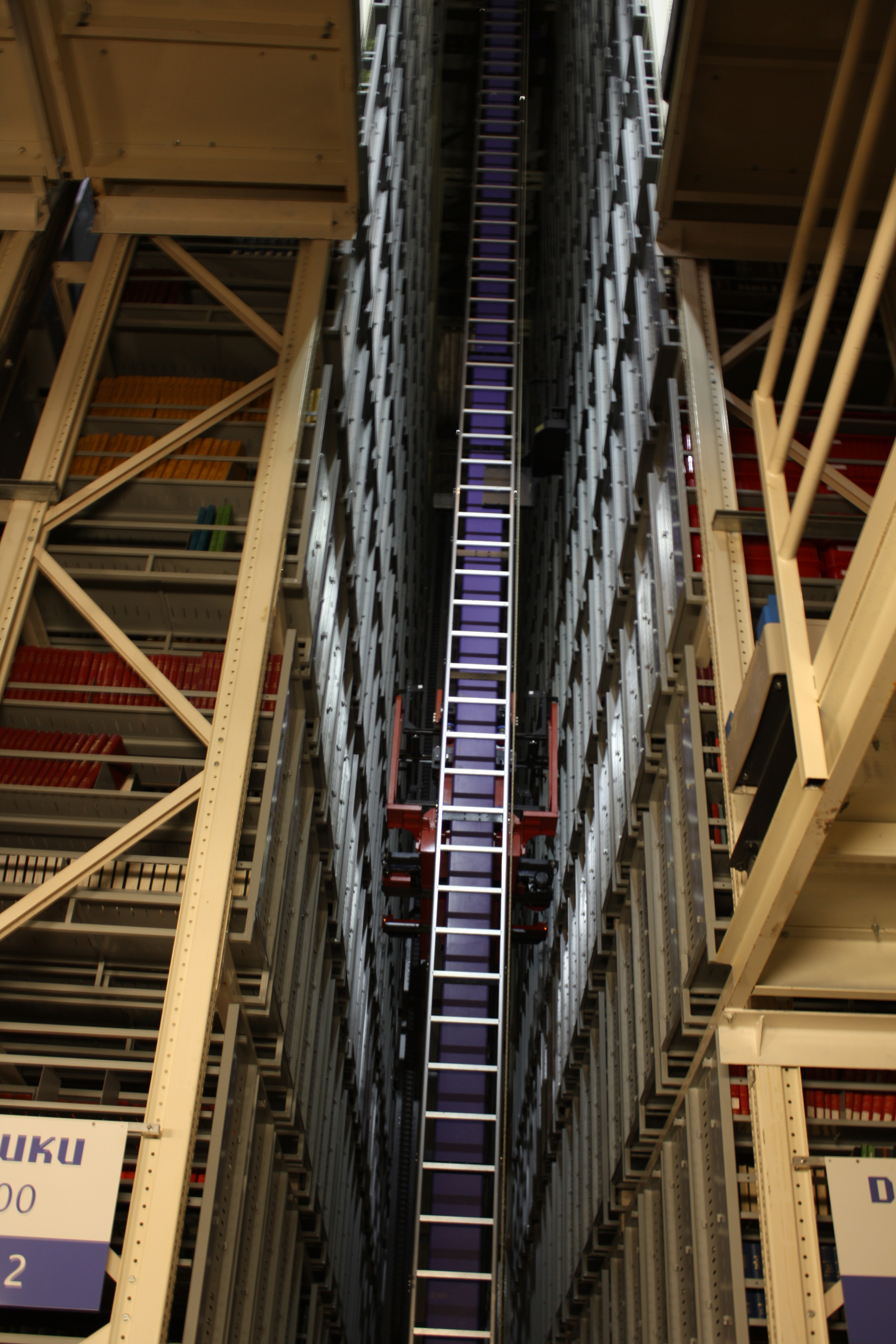
BARN as viewed from basement.

An automated storage and retrieval system (ASRS) is an integral part of the building and allows for many years of collection development. Designed and built by Daifuku of America at its North American Headquarters in Salt Lake City, the system is enclosed in a 56-foot-wide (17 m) by 140-foot-long (43 m) and 80-foot-high (24 m) climate-controlled corner of the library building. Three aisles of shelves are served by three Storage and Retrieval Machines (SRMs) that can retrieve an average of 875 volumes a day. There is space to add a fourth row of shelves when it is needed. The BARN (Borrower's Automated Retrieval Network) was so named in reference to Utah State University's status as an agricultural school.

All of the Merrill–Cazier Library's bound journals, over 200,000 less frequently used books, and most of the microform are stored in the BARN. There are currently nearly 550,000 items with room to expand to approximately 1.5 million items.
