= List of the oldest buildings in Utah =

This article lists the oldest extant buildings in Utah, including extant buildings and structures constructed before and during American rule over Utah. Only buildings built prior to 1870 are suitable for inclusion on this list, or the building must be the oldest of its type.

To qualify for the list, a structure must:

- be a recognizable building (defined as any human-made structure used or intended for supporting or sheltering any use or continuous occupancy);
- incorporate features of building work from the claimed date to at least 1.5 metres (4.9 ft) in height and/or be a listed building.

This consciously excludes ruins of limited height, roads and statues. Bridges may be included if they otherwise fulfill the above criteria. Dates for many of the oldest structures have been arrived at by radiocarbon dating or dendrochronology and should be considered approximate. If the exact year of initial construction is estimated, it will be shown as a range of dates.

== Prehistoric ==
Building	Image	Location	First built	Use	Notes
Ruins Hovenweep National Monument		Bluff, Utah	ca. 900 AD	Residences	Ancient ruins
Ruins Dark Canyon Ruins		Blanding, Utah	1200 AD	Residences	Ancient ruins

== 19th century ==
Building	Image	Location	First built	Use	Notes
Miles Goodyear Cabin		Ogden, Utah	1845	Residence	Oldest extant non-native building in Utah. Constructed by mountain man Miles Goodyear as part of Fort Buenaventura. Currently displayed outside the Weber County Daughters of Utah Pioneers museum.
Deuel Cabin		Salt Lake City, Utah	1847	Residence	One of two surviving cabins from Salt Lake City's Pioneer Fort. Built for Mormon pioneers Osmyn & Mary Deuel. Currently displayed outside the Church History Museum.
Riter Cabin		Salt Lake City, Utah	1847	Residence	The other surviving cabin from Salt Lake City's Pioneer Fort. Built for Mormon pioneers Levi & Rebecca Riter. Currently displayed at This Is the Place Heritage Park.
Isaac Chase Mill		Liberty Park (Salt Lake City)	1847–1852	Mill	One of oldest buildings in Utah from nineteenth century settlement era
Fielding Garr Ranch		Antelope Island	1848	Residence	Said to be the oldest building in Utah still on its original foundation.
Robert Gardner Jr. House	framless	Millcreek, Utah	1848	Residence	Likely oldest residence in Utah.
Utah Territorial Statehouse		Fillmore, Utah	1853	Statehouse	Home of Utah's first Territorial Legislature
Clark–Taylor House		Provo, Utah	1854	Residence	One of oldest buildings in Utah
Anson Call House		Bountiful, Utah	1855 - 1859	Residence	One of the oldest buildings in Utah
Chase Home Museum of Utah Folk Arts		Salt Lake City, Utah	1856	Residence	Oldest house in Salt Lake City
Seely Barn		Mt. Pleasant, Utah	1862	Barn	Oldest barn in UT
Bountiful Tabernacle		Bountiful, Utah	1863	Church, Tabernacle	One of the oldest large gathering places still standing in Utah

== See also ==
- National Register of Historic Places listings in Utah
- History of Utah
- Oldest buildings in the United States
- List of Ancestral Puebloan dwellings in Utah
