= List of Ancestral Puebloan dwellings in Utah =

This is a list of Ancestral Puebloan dwellings in Utah, United States.

== Locations ==
Site name	Pueblo peoples	Nearest town (modern name)	Location	Type	Description	Photo
Hovenweep Castle	Ancestral Puebloan	Bluff			Ruins located in Hovenweep National Monument.	
Square Tower	Ancestral Puebloan	Bluff			Ruins located in Hovenweep National Monument.	
Cutthroat Castle	Ancestral Puebloan	Bluff			Ruins located in Hovenweep National Monument.	
Horseshoe	Ancestral Puebloan	Bluff			Ruins located in Hovenweep National Monument.	
Hackberry	Ancestral Puebloan	Bluff			Ruins located in Hovenweep National Monument.	
Holly	Ancestral Puebloan	Bluff			Ruins located in Hovenweep National Monument.	
Cajon	Ancestral Puebloan	Bluff			Ruins located in Hovenweep National Monument.	
Monarch Cave	Ancestral Puebloan	Bluff			Ruins located in Butler Wash, Utah.	
Hovenweep House	Ancestral Puebloan	Bluff			Ruins located in Hovenweep National Monument.	
Rim Rock House	Ancestral Puebloan	Bluff			Ruins located in Hovenweep National Monument.	
Twin Towers	Ancestral Puebloan	Bluff			Ruins located in Hovenweep National Monument.	
Stronghold House	Ancestral Puebloan	Bluff			Ruins located in Hovenweep National Monument.	
Edge of the Cedars		Blanding			Ruins located in the Edge of the Cedars State Park.	
Three Kiva		Monticello			Ruins.	
Dark Canyon Ruins	Ancestral Puebloans	Blanding	Dark Canyon Wilderness	Cliff dwelling	Ruins located in Dark Canyon Wilderness	
White Canyon (Horsecollar Ruin)	Ancestral Puebloan				Ruins located in Natural Bridges National Monument.	
House on Fire				Cliff dwelling	Ruins.	
Fallen Roof				Cliff dwelling	Ruins.	
Butler Canyon ruins				Cliff dwelling	Ruins.	
Coombs site		Boulder		Great house	Ruins. Located at the Anasazi State Park Museum.	
Defiance House	Ancestral Puebloan	Bullfrog			Located in the Glen Canyon National Recreation Area at Lake Powell.	

== See also ==
- History of Utah
- List of the oldest buildings in Utah
