= Irreantum =

Literary journal

- Cover of Irreantum, Vol 12 Issue 2 (2010)
- Editor: Theric Jepson (2020– )
- Former editors: Benson Parkinson (1999–2000) Chris Bigelow (1999–2004) Laraine Wilkins (2004–2006) Valerie Holladay (2006–2008) Scott Hatch (2006–2009) Angella Hallstorm (2009–2011) Jack Harrell (2010–2013) Josh Allen (2011–2013) William Morris (2018–2020)
- Categories: Literary Journal
- Format: Print (1999–2013); Online (2018– )
- Publisher: Association for Mormon Letters
- Founder: Chris Bigelow; Benson Parkinson
- Founded: 1999
- Country: United States
- Language: English
- Website: Irreantum
- ISSN: 1528-0594
- OCLC: 42796196

Irreantum is a literary journal compiled and published by the Association for Mormon Letters (AML) from 1999 to 2013, with online-only publication starting in 2018. It features selections of LDS literature, including fiction, poetry, and essays, as well as criticism of those works. The journal was advertised as "the only magazine devoted to Mormon literature." In its first years of publication, Irreantum was printed quarterly; later, it was printed twice a year. A subscription to the magazine was included in an AML membership. Annual Irreantum writing contests were held, with prizes for short stories, novel excerpts, poems, and nonfiction awarded. The journal's creators, Benson Parkinson and Chris Bigelow, sought to create a publication that would become a one-stop resource where companies interested in publishing LDS literature could find the best the subculture had to offer. They also hoped Irreantum would highlight various kinds of LDS writing, balancing both liberal and traditional points of view.

== History ==
Irreantum was founded in 1999 by Benson Y. Parkinson and Chris Bigelow. Its name was inspired by a term used in the Book of Mormon to describe "many waters" and was selected by the Association for Mormon Letters (AML) "to show that the journal would welcome many different types of writing by, for, or about Mormons." Irreantum replaced the AML's newsletter, which had been published since 1977. The first edition of Irreantum, published in 1999, was a "guest issue" of the newsletter. Irreantum expanded on what AML-List, "an email forum for discussions of Mormon letters," started in 1995. Bigelow and Parkinson recruited Irreantum's first staff from the team that had worked on AML-List. Some of the content published in the journal came from AML-List itself, but new essays, poetry, and fiction were also included. Irreantum also contained news about the LDS publishing industry and upcoming events, interviews with authors, and reviews of books, films, and plays. Writers such as Anne Perry, Brian Evenson, Margaret Blair Young, Dean Hughes, and Dave Wolverton have contributed to Irreantum. The journal also published the works of at least three new writers per year. Issues were printed quarterly and distributed from Provo, Utah. The editorial staff used DocuTech to print Irreantum. Each copy cost about $1.80 to print in quantities of 400.

Under the journal's first co-editors, Parkinson and Bigelow, the magazine was called Irreantum: Magazine of the Association for Mormon Letters. When Laraine Wilkins became editor in 2004, the subtitle changed to A Review of Mormon Literature and Film. Wilkins also changed Irreantum from a quarterly journal to a biannual publication. This change also included expanding the poetry section in the magazine. After Wilkins, Valerie Holladay, Scott Hatch, Angela Hallstorm, Jack Harrell, and Josh Allen served as editors. Irreantum was sponsored by the Utah Arts Council and the National Endowment for the Arts.

Because Irreantum's staff was spread out across the U.S., the publication was compiled entirely over e-mail; similarly, submissions were received electronically. The magazine's audience included those who were not members of the Church of Jesus Christ of Latter-day Saints. Circulation reached 500. Subscribing to the magazine cost $12 a year; however, if the subscriber was a member of the Association for Mormon Letters, he or she could receive the magazine for no extra charge. In 2000, Bigelow stated that the AML's membership "almost doubled" as a result of Irreantum.

Irreantum also hosted a fiction contest each year, as well as an essay contest. Submissions that showcased "the Mormon experience" were accepted. Authors did not have to be members of the Church in order to have their writing considered. Short stories and chapters from novels could be submitted. The judges read the entries "blind." Three fiction writers were selected as winners and, in addition to receiving a cash prize, were published in the following issue of Irreantum. Three poems and works of creative nonfiction were also awarded, and honorable mentions were named.

The last print edition of Irreantum was released in 2013. Archives of its early editions are available on Irreantum's current website.

== Online publication ==
In 2018, the Association for Mormon Letters announced that Irreantum would be resurrected as an online-only journal after a five-year hiatus. A team of editors switch positions in order to provide each issue with a distinct look, feel, and voice. The first issue after the re-launch published solely poetry, essays, and short stories. Like earlier editions, the new Irreantum sought to publish a wide variety of LDS literature. It received a variety of submissions from both experienced and new authors.

== See also ==
- AML Awards
