= Todd Robert Petersen =

American novelist (born 1969)

- Born: August 17, 1969 (age 57); Moses Lake, Washington, U.S.
- Education: University of Oregon; Northern Arizona University; Oklahoma State University
- Occupations: Writer; academic
- Spouse: Alisa
- Children: 3
- Writing career
- Genre: Fiction
- Website: www.toddpetersen.org

Todd Robert Petersen (born in Moses Lake, Washington on August 17, 1969) is an American fiction writer and academic. He is currently based at Southern Utah University, and is one of eleven writers selected by the Utah Arts Council to represent the arts in Utah education.

He and his wife Alisa have three children.

== Writing ==
Petersen's fiction has appeared in many print and online magazines. In 2007, his work was collected into the collection Long After Dark. Petersen's work is highly regarded in the Mormon arts community, where Long Before Dark has been called what "should be the model for LDS literature."

Petersen's fiction and poems have won him several awards, including the AWP Intro Award, the Marilyn Brown Novel Award, Utah Arts Award, and Sunstone Foundation awards.

Peterson was a founding editor of The Sugar Beet, an online Mormon satire magazine comparable to The Onion.

His first novel, Rift, was released in 2009 by Zarahemla Books. It has been awarded both the Marilyn Brown Award and the Association for Mormon Letters Award for best novel of 2009.

== Academics ==
Petersen received his bachelors at the University of Oregon, his masters at Northern Arizona University and his doctorate at Oklahoma State University. His masters and doctorate focused on creative writing. He received his PhD in 2001 and moved to SUU the same year.

His academic writing focuses on Western, Mormon, and pop-culture themes.
