= David H. Jones House =

Historic house in Utah, United States

- U.S. National Register of Historic Places
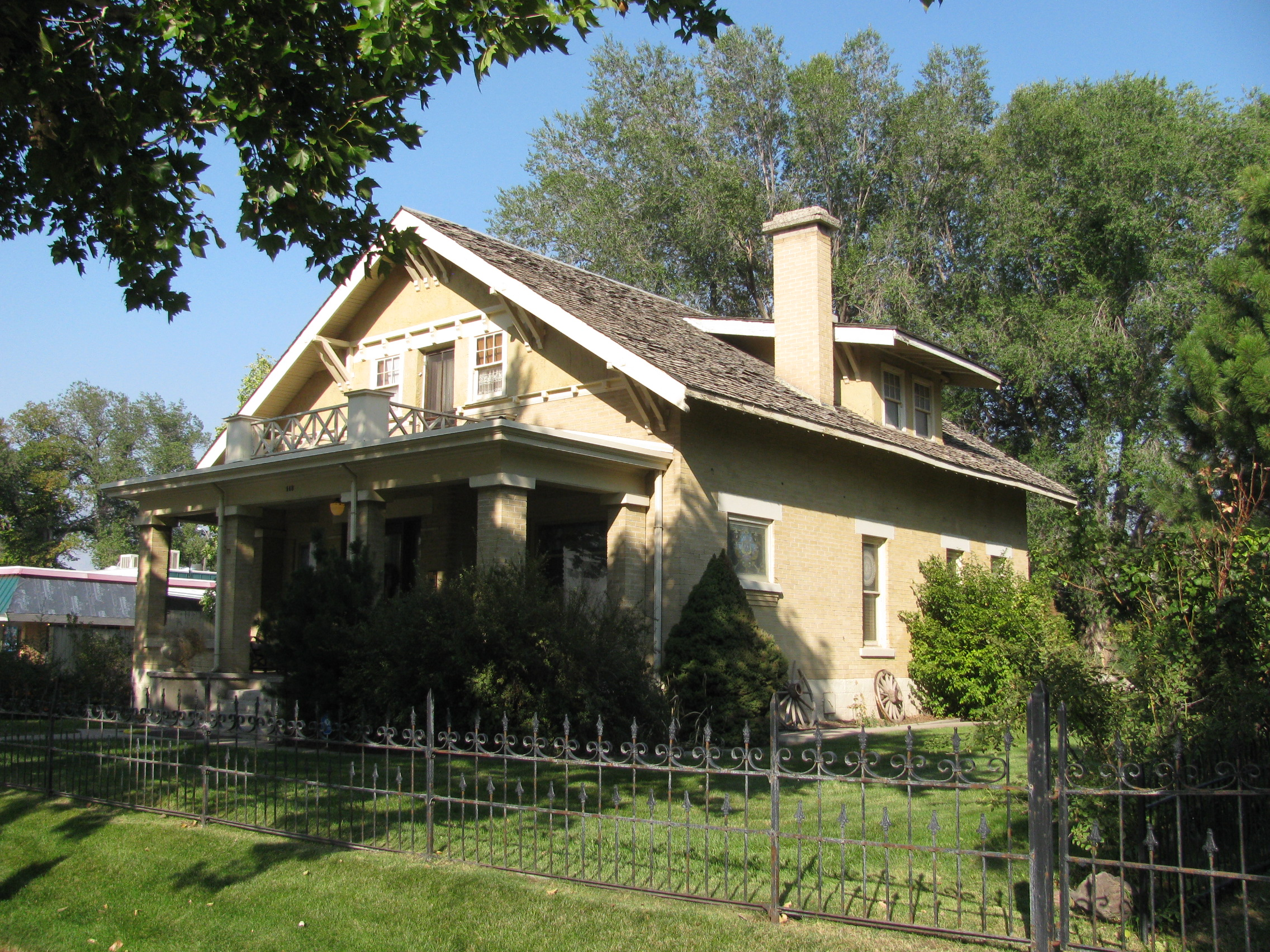

- Location within Utah Location within the United States
- Location: 143 South Main; Spanish Fork, Utah; United States
- Coordinates: 40°6′29″N 111°38′54″W
- Area: 0.3 acres (0.12 ha)
- Built: 1912
- Architect: Ware Walter
- Architectural style: Late Victorian, Colonial Revival
- NRHP reference No.: 85003392
- Added to NRHP: October 24, 1985

The David H. Jones House is located at 143 South Main Street in Spanish Fork, Utah, United States and was added to the National Register of Historic Places in 1985.

== Description ==
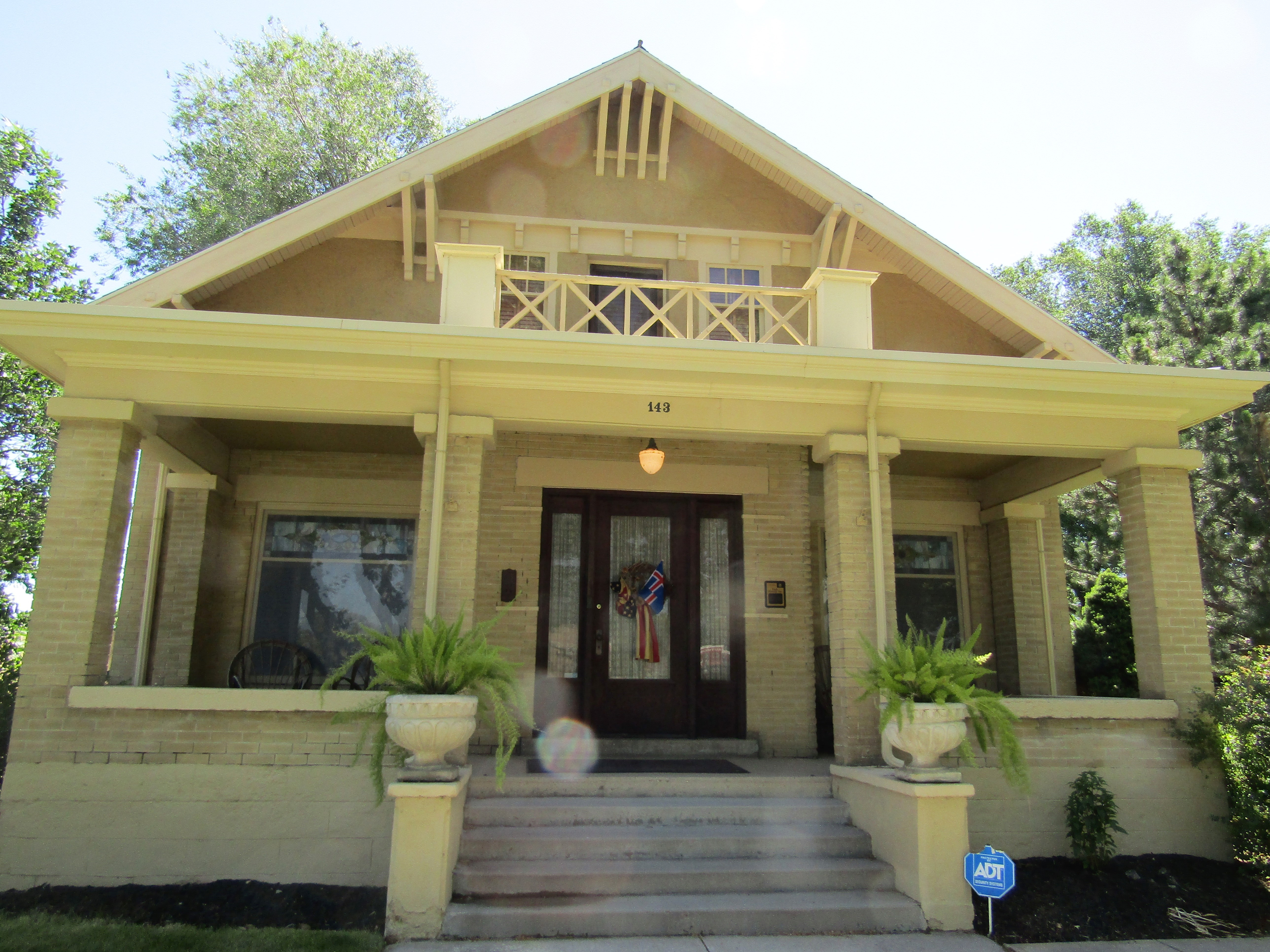
Close up view of the David H. Jones House, June 2018

The house was built in 1912 for David H. and Mary E. Nielsen Jones, who lived there until their deaths in 1959 and 1976, respectively. In addition to running his own farm and livestock operations, David Jones served as the Commissioner of Agriculture for Utah, the president of the Utah State Farm Bureau, and as the president of the Utah County Cooperative Dairy for 20 years. His political career included six years of service as a Spanish Fork city councilman and two terms as a state senator.

Also located on the property is the Spanish Fork Pioneer Park, which is currently owned and operated by Jones's granddaughter Elaine Jones Hughes, and her husband who have dedicated the property to Spanish Fork's pioneer heritage. Located at the park are several historic pioneer log cabins with connections to Spanish Fork pioneers, a mill that came from Leland, and a pump house that had its origins in Salt Lake City. Pioneer Park is open on Pioneer Day and is also the location of the Fiesta Days quilt show.

== See also ==
- National Register of Historic Places listings in Utah County, Utah
