= Clark–Taylor House =

Historic house in Utah, United States

- U.S. National Register of Historic Places
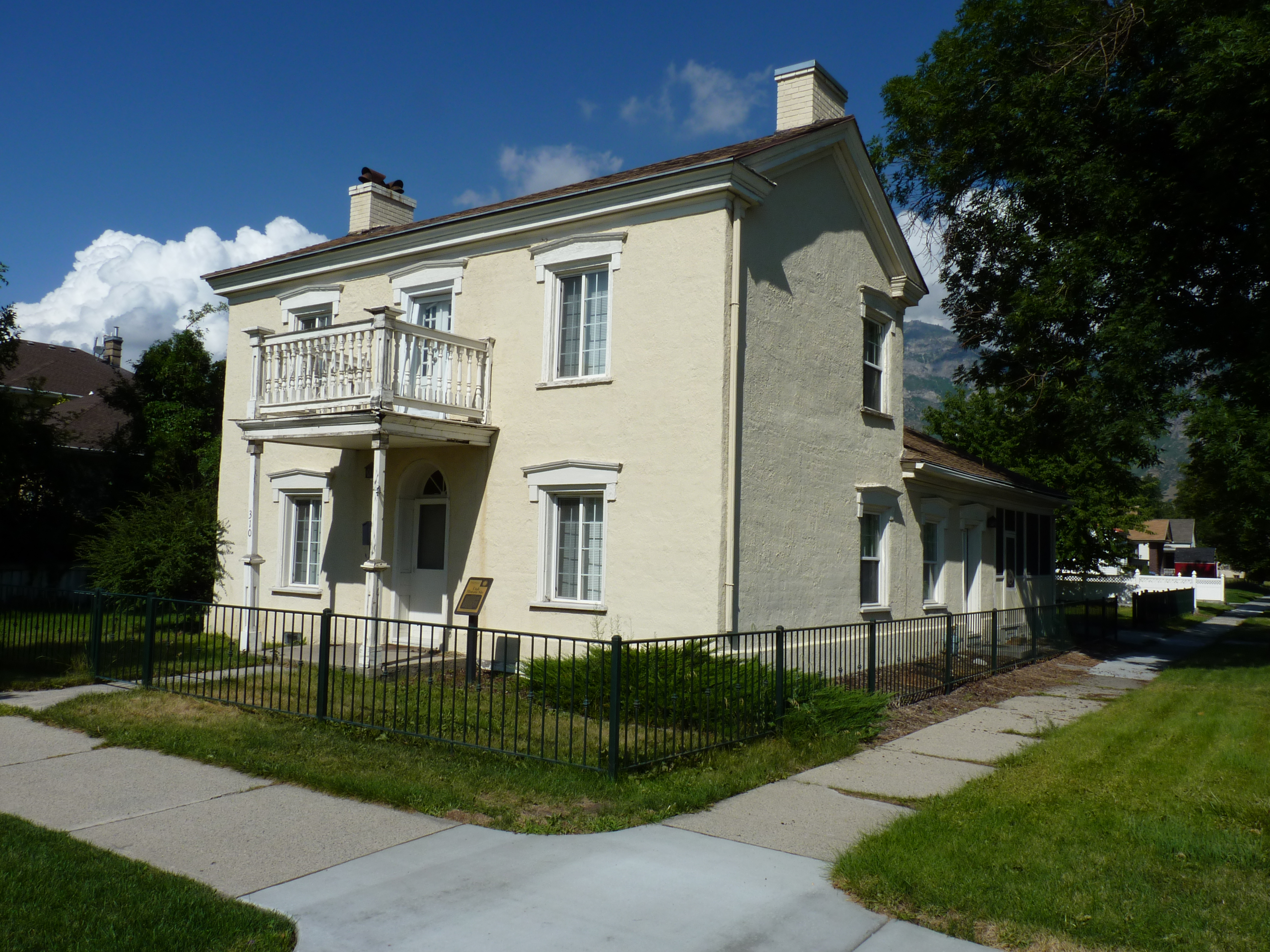
- Clark–Taylor House

- Location within Utah Location within the United States
- Location: 306 North 500 West; Provo, Utah
- Coordinates: 40°14′17″N 111°39′59″W
- Area: Less than 1 acre (0.40 ha)
- Built: 1854
- NRHP reference No.: 75001829
- Added to NRHP: 1975

The Clark–Taylor House is a historic building located in Provo, Utah, United States. It is listed on the National Register of Historic Places. It has also been known as the T. N. Taylor Home. One of the oldest pioneer buildings in the state, the Clark–Taylor House was built around 1854. Thomas N. Taylor, a Provo Mayor, LDS bishop, and stake president, along with being a chairman of the board of trustees of BYU, lived in this home. The Clark–Taylor House was designated to the Provo City Historic Landmarks Registry on March 7, 1996.

== Structure ==
Still sturdy, the Clark–Taylor House is “Built in two sections, the two-story western section is a rectangular, gabled roof, single depth, 2/2 “I-form” structure. The eastern section has one story with a large attic. It is situated laterally with respect to the western section and has a broad gabled end (Hinckley/ Roberts p. 2).” The Clark–Taylor House is one of the rare examples of a home still in reasonably good condition marking the time of the arrival of the pioneers coming to Provo in 1847.

== History ==
The first mentioning of the Clark–Taylor House is found in a consecration deed by Edward W. Clark to Brigham Young on July 24, 1855. The deed gives up ownership to the property to the church. Built just after the pioneers settled in Provo, the Clark home is one of the oldest pioneer structures in the state of Utah. Edward Clark relocated from England to Provo in the year 1852. An influential man, Clark eventually became bishop of the Provo Third Ward, a war veteran, and director of the Utah County branch of the Agricultural and Manufacturing Company.

After Clark the home passed to John H. Carter, an alderman and a blacksmith who had served as Clark's counselor in his capacity as a bishop for the LDS Church. In the 1870s, after adding a second story to the home in 1863, Carter relinquished the home to Benjamin Bachman, in exchange for 85 acres of land. George H. Church attained the property in 1897, and in turn sold it to Thomas N. Taylor in 1898. Taylor bestowed the home upon his son, T. Sterling, as a wedding present in the year 1915. The house remains in the family to this day.

== Thomas N. Taylor ==
Thomas N. Taylor was born in 1868 in Provo, Utah, the son of George Taylor Sr. and Eliza Nicholls Taylor. His father, George Taylor Sr., had founded the Taylor furniture store in 1866, which was the first furniture store in Provo. The company continued to grow, and eventually became incorporated as Taylor Brothers furniture in Provo. Thomas' education consisted of attending Provo schools and eventually Brigham Young Academy (now university). He married Maud Rogers in the L.D.S. Manti temple in the year 1889. Thomas was a political man. He was mayor of Provo from 1900 to 1903, and a candidate for governor of Utah as a democrat in 1920, although he did not win the election. Thomas was also active in his religion. A prominent member of the L.D.S. faith, Taylor served as bishop of the Provo Third Ward for nineteen years and subsequently served as president of the Utah Stake for twenty years. Taylor also served as a stake patriarch within the LDS church. Also active within the community, Thomas was a member of the board of trustees of Brigham Young University and served as chairman of that group and of the University of Utah Board of Regents. Taylor also helped to establish the Utah Valley Hospital. Thomas Taylor died in 1950.

== See also ==
- Thomas N. Taylor House, also in Provo, also NRHP-listed
- List of the oldest buildings in Utah
