= Arianne Cope =

American novelist

- Occupation: Novelist
- Writing career
- Notable awards: Marilyn Brown Novel Award (2006)

Arianne B. Cope is an American Latter-day Saint novelist.

Cope has written many articles for such LDS Church publications as the New Era.

Cope has been a recipient of the Marilyn Brown Novel Award from the Association for Mormon Letters for her novel The Coming of Elijah. This novel has been criticized for its portrayal of the LDS Church's Indian Placement Program.

Cope has also been the editor of the Tremonton Ledger, a newspaper published in Tremonton, Utah.
