= Liberty Park (Salt Lake City) =

Public park in Utah, US

- Interactive map of Liberty Park
- Type: Urban park
- Location: Salt Lake City, Utah
- Created: 1882
- Status: Open all year
- Liberty Park
- U.S. National Register of Historic Places
- U.S. Historic district
- Location within Utah Location within the United States
- Coordinates: 40°44′44″N 111°52′26″W
- Area: 80 acres (32 ha)
- Architect: Don Carlos Young
- NRHP reference No.: 80003926
- Added to NRHP: December 11, 1980
- Isaac Chase Mill
- U.S. National Register of Historic Places
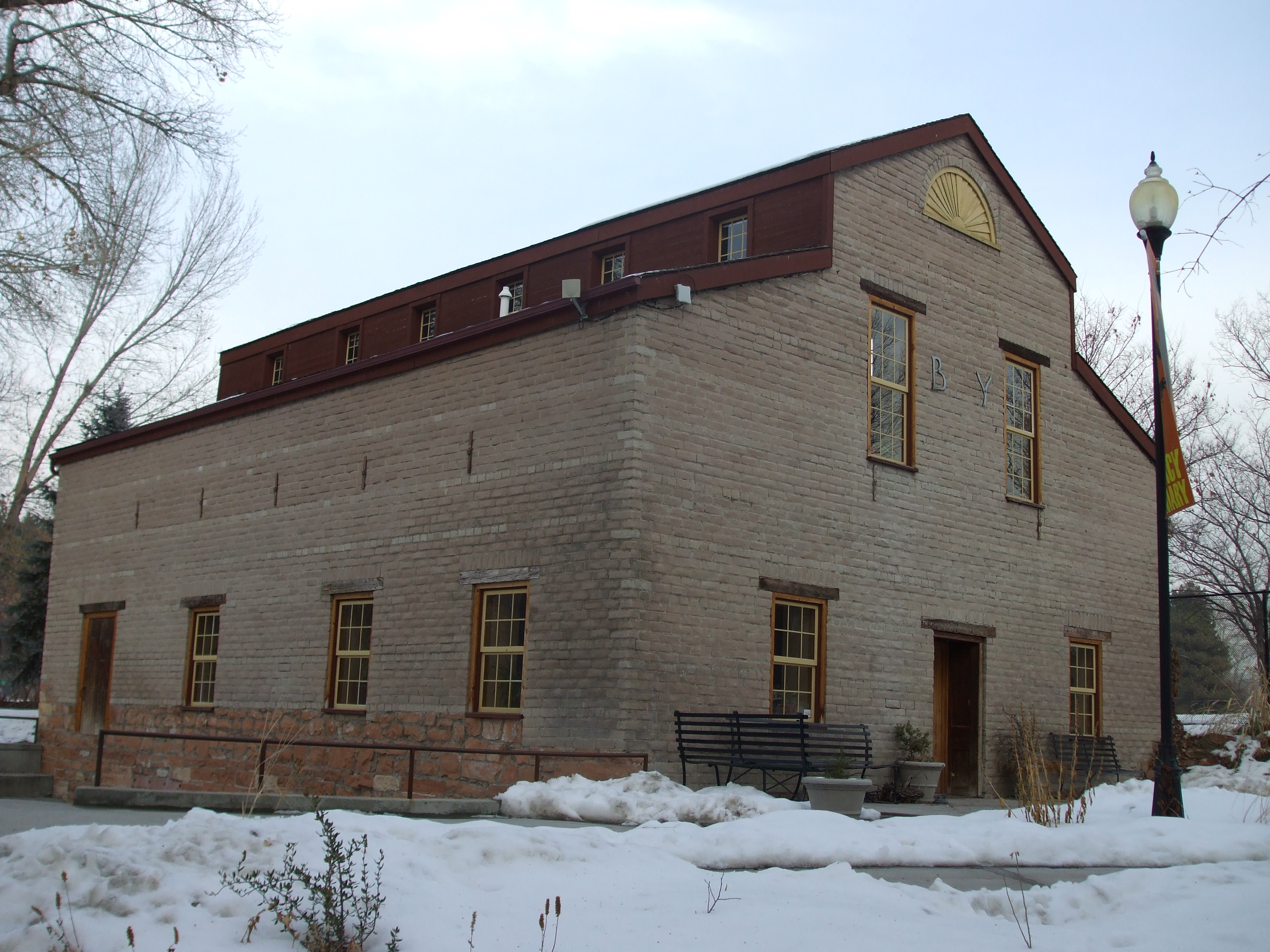
- Location: Liberty Park, 6th East, Salt Lake City, Utah
- Coordinates: 40°44′36″N 111°52′25″W
- Built: 1852
- Architect: Weeks, William
- Part of: The Tracy Aviary in Liberty Park (ID80003926)
- NRHP reference No.: 70000627
- Added to NRHP: June 15, 1970

Liberty Park is a popular public urban park in Salt Lake City, Utah. It is the city's second-largest public park, at 80 acres (32 ha), being surpassed only by Sugar House Park which has 110.5 acres (44.7 ha). The park features a pond with two islands, and is also the location of Tracy Aviary. The park is listed on the National Register of Historic Places (NRHP) and it includes the Isaac Chase Mill, which is also NRHP-listed.

The park is prominently featured in all seasons of the Disney Channel original series Andi Mack, however, it is never mentioned by name.

== Facilities ==
Public facilities include playgrounds, restrooms, bowery, concession stand, children's play areas, picnic areas, large grassy areas, horseshoe pits, a swimming pool, basketball courts, volleyball courts, tennis courts, bocce ball courts, a 1.5-mile woodchip jogging path, a 1.42-mile paved jogging path, seasonal amusement rides and a greenhouse. Other seasonal activities and public facilities include paddle boats, recreational games, and festivals. It is a popular jogging, rollerblading and cycling location.

Liberty Park is a popular place to sit and watch Salt Lake City's Pioneer Day fireworks display, which go off in the park across the street, on the 24th of July.

Large crowds gather in the park on Sundays during the spring, summer, and early fall for drum circles that last all day. An assortment of people, pets (primarily dogs), musical instruments and dance styles merge every Sunday at the park.

A sculpture/fountain models the Jordan River and its canyon tributaries. In the summertime children can play in the water fountain.

=== NRHP listing ===
The entire 110 acres (45 ha) of the park was listed on the National Register of Historic Places in 1980 as Liberty Park.

It was established in 1881 upon purchase from the estate of Brigham Young. It is significant as "Utah's best example of the 'central park'", following example of New York City's Central Park in the general reform movement that represented.

Several historic buildings and markers are located throughout the park.

=== Isaac Chase Mill ===
The Isaac Chase Mill is located in the northeast corner of Tracy Aviary, off 6th East. Built in 1852, the mill is the oldest commercial building still standing in Utah. It was listed on the U.S. National Register of Historic Places in 1970. The mill was designed by architect William Weeks.

=== Chase Home ===
The Chase Home Museum of Utah Folk Arts is located in the historic two-story adobe house of Isaac Chase. Admission to the museum is free. The Chase home is operated by the Utah Division of Arts & Museums. It is the permanent home of the State Folk Arts Collection since 1987 and over 200,000 visitors have experienced its free programs. It has become the place where traditional artists from Utah's ethnic, native, occupational and rural communities share their crafts, music, and dance with their own communities, their fellow Utahns, and with visitors from around the world. In addition to exhibits and concerts, the Chase Home contains a large archive of recordings and photographs that document Utah's traditional culture.

== Tracy Aviary ==
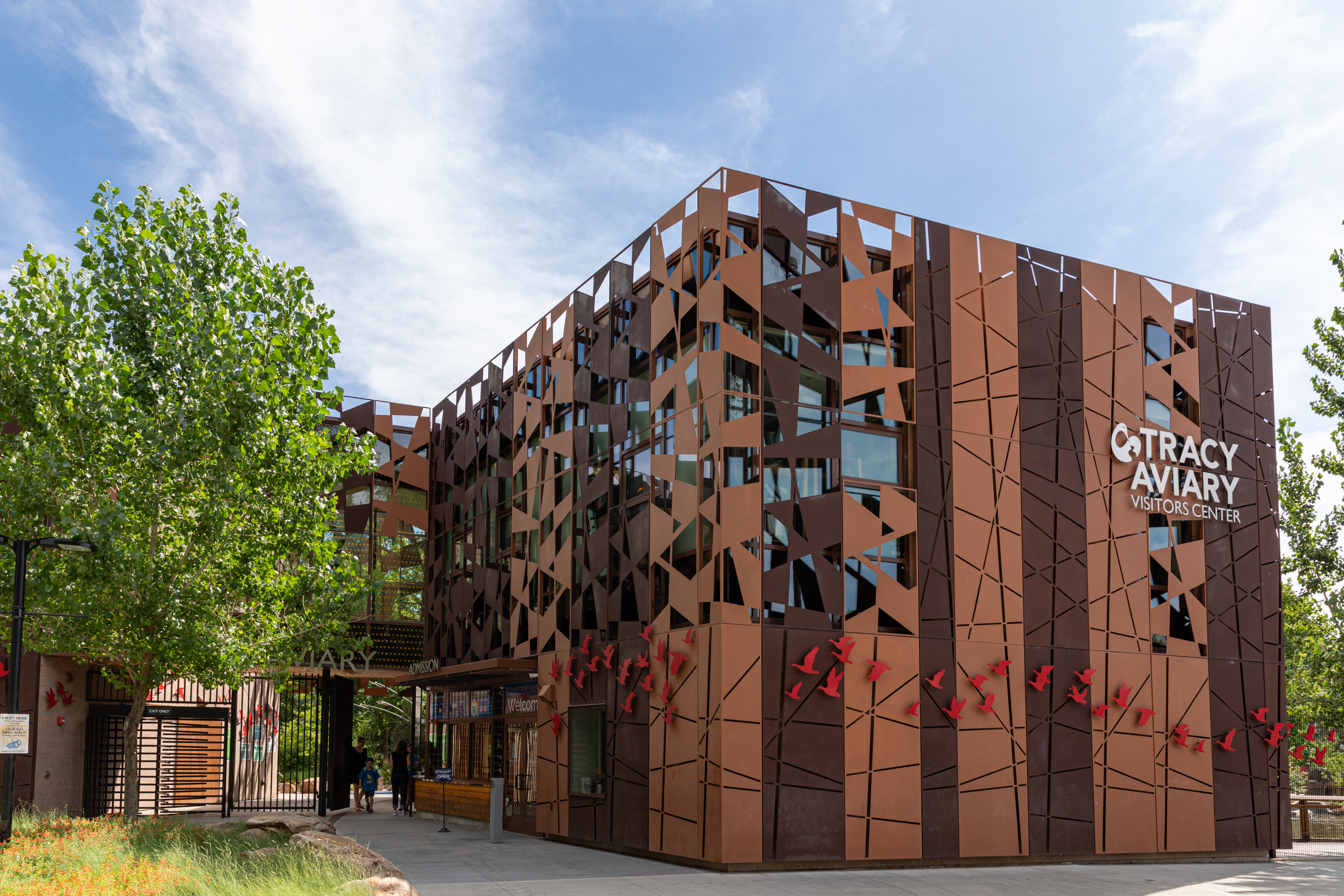
Tracy Aviary

Tracy Aviary is located on 8 acres (3.2 ha) of land in Liberty Park. A Salt Lake City banker Russell Lord Tracy founded Tracy Aviary when he donated his private bird collection to Salt Lake City and its children. Open to the public since 1938, Tracy Aviary maintains a collection of approximately 400 birds representing about 135 species, such as swans, flamingos, eagles, vultures, and most recently, Victoria crowned pigeons. Several of those bird species participate in their Species Survival Plan. The SSP is a breeding program that promotes genetic diversity in the captive animal populations. The Tracy Aviary is also an AZA accredited facility, and it is one of two free standing aviaries in the nation.

== History ==
In 1860 the land became the property of Brigham Young, who planted varieties of mulberry, cottonwood and other trees. In pioneer days it was known as Mill Farm, Forest Park and Locust Patch. In 1881, Salt Lake City purchased the land from the Young estate. Also in 1881 the city held a public competition for the park's landscape design. Joseph Don Carlos Young, Utah's first academically trained architect and a son of Brigham Young, won the competition which included a $100 premium. On June 17, 1882, the 80 acres rectangular parcel was introduced as a recreational area and officially named Liberty Park.

A city zoo once operated within the park, but was relocated and became the Hogle Zoo in 1931. In 1938 the Tracy Aviary opened.

Many of the park's trees were toppled by the 2020 Utah windstorm.

== Red Butte Creek oil spill ==
In June 2010, an estimated 20,000 gallons of oil spilled into the Red Butte Creek from a Chevron Corporation pipeline. The spill prompted the closure of Liberty Park as oil spread to the nearby Jordan River. 150 to 200 birds, many of them Canada geese, came in contact with the oil and were taken to Hogle Zoo to be cleaned. Officials have advised residents that humans and animals should avoid water access points along Liberty Park, the Jordan River and Red Butte Canyon.

== Images ==
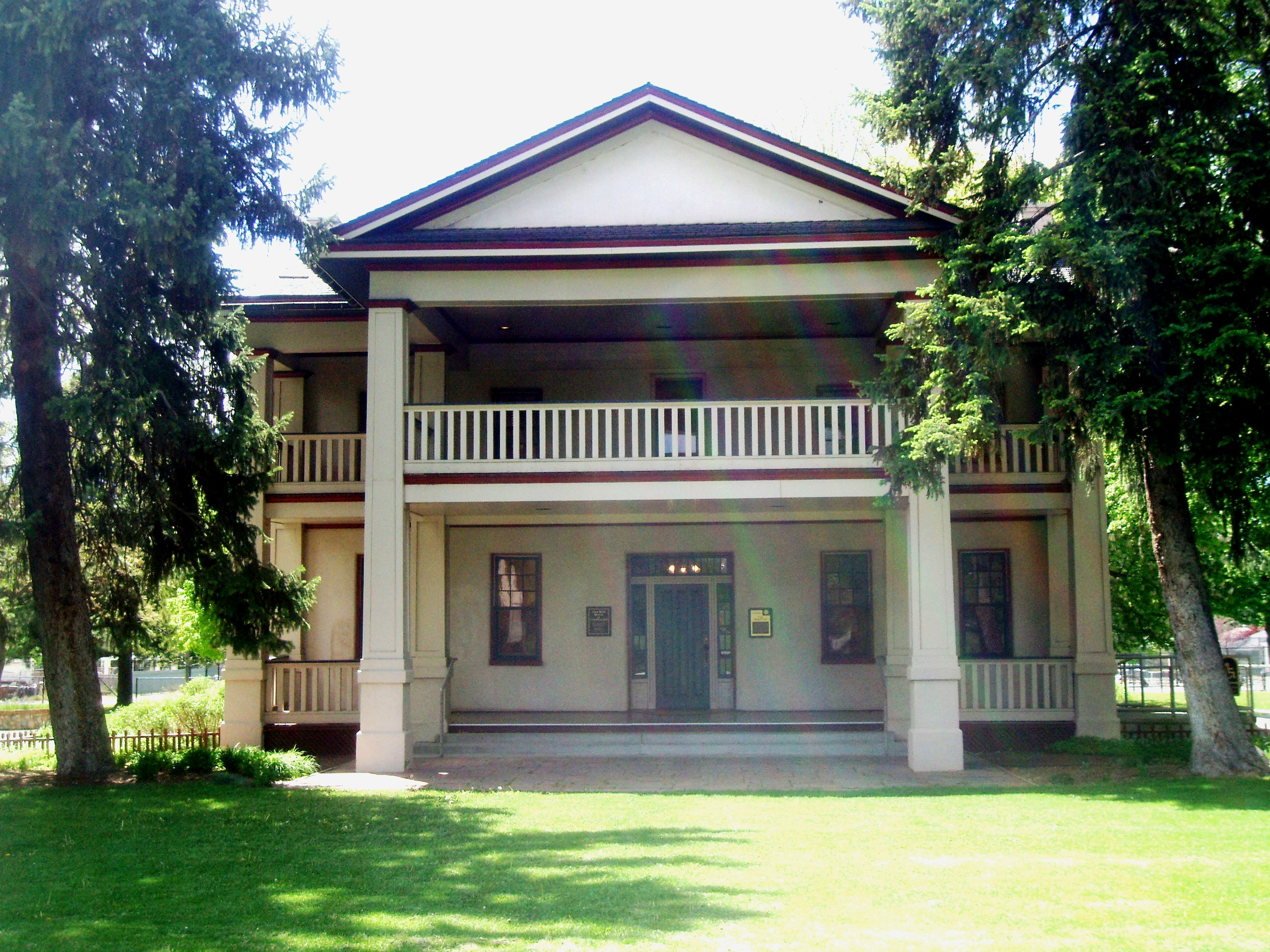
Chase Home Museum of Utah Folk Arts

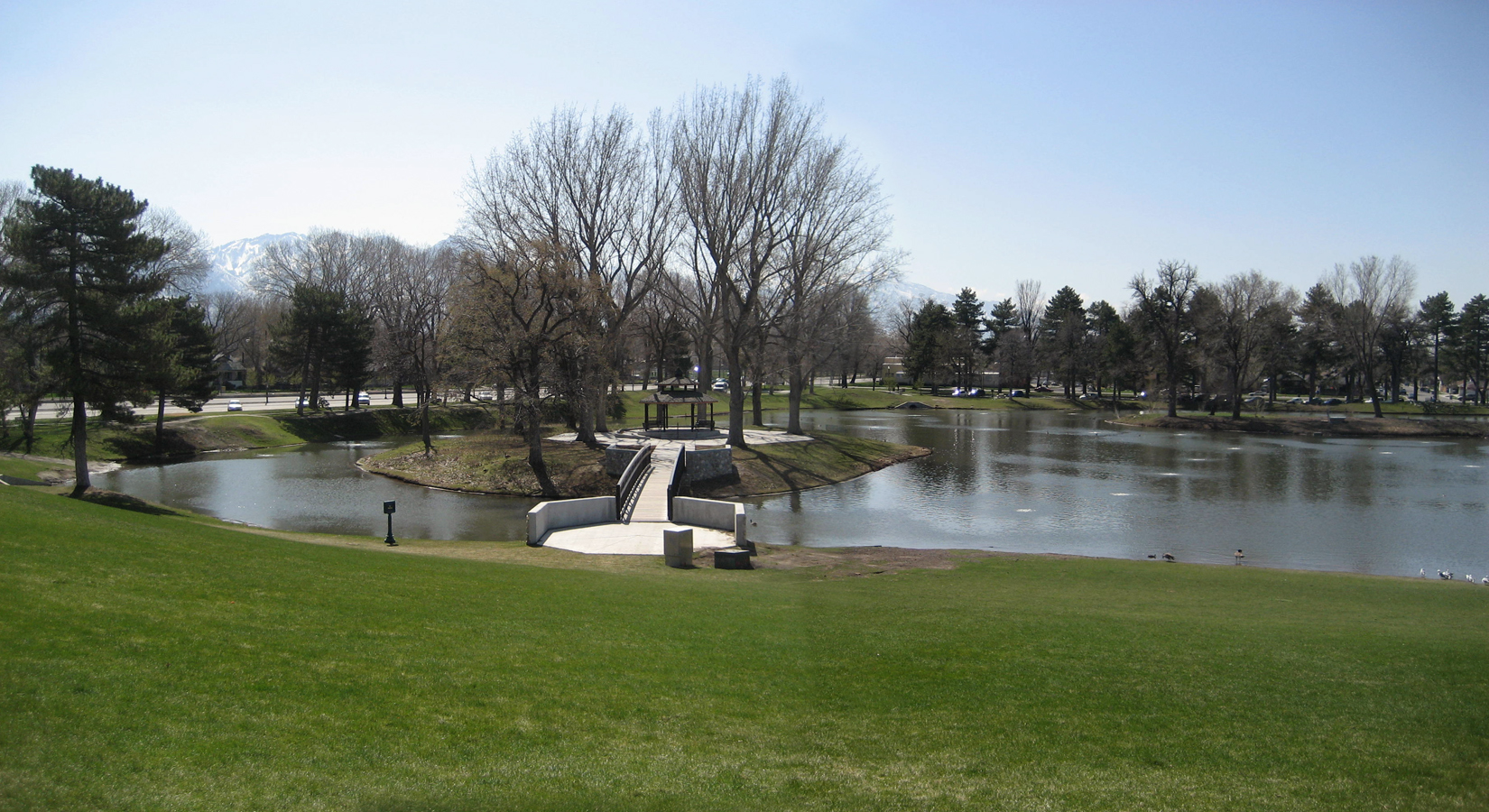
Liberty Lake

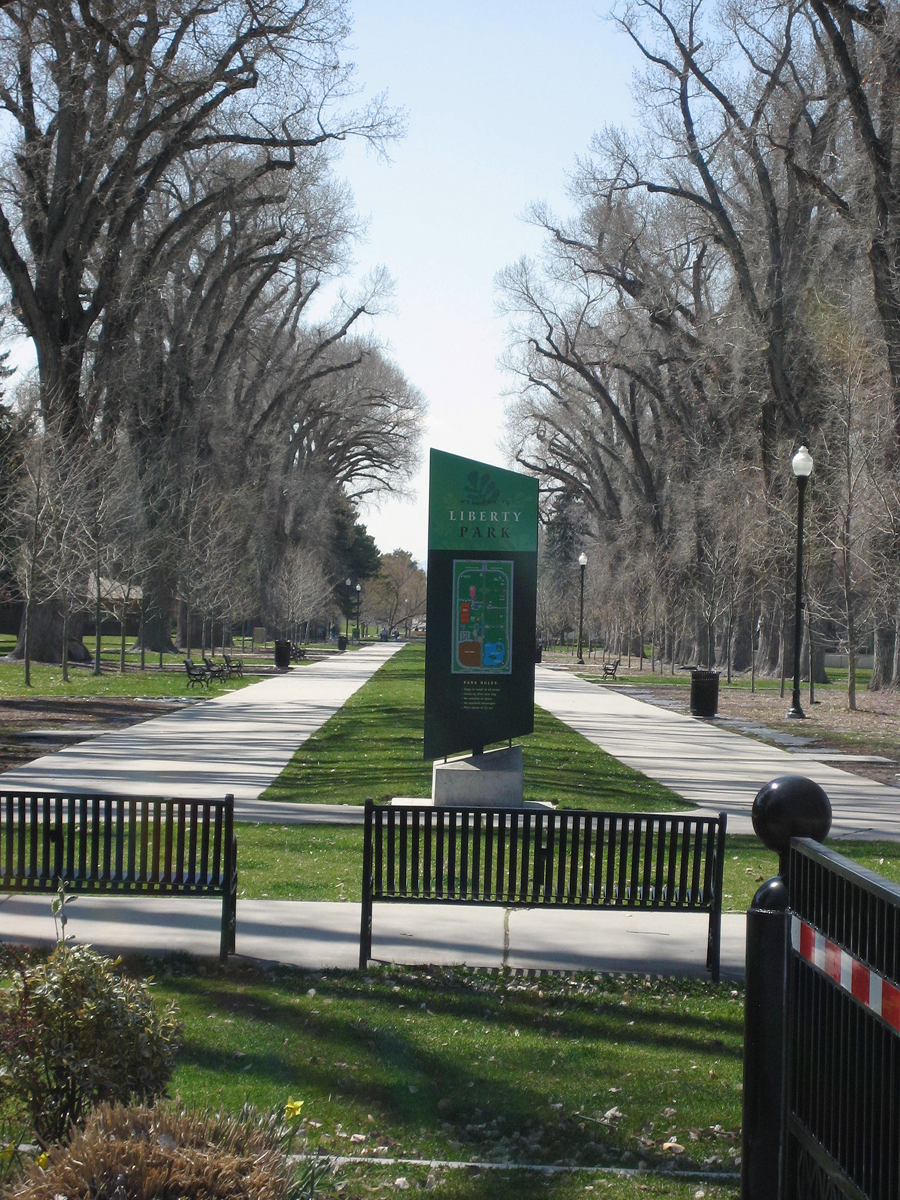
900 South Entrance

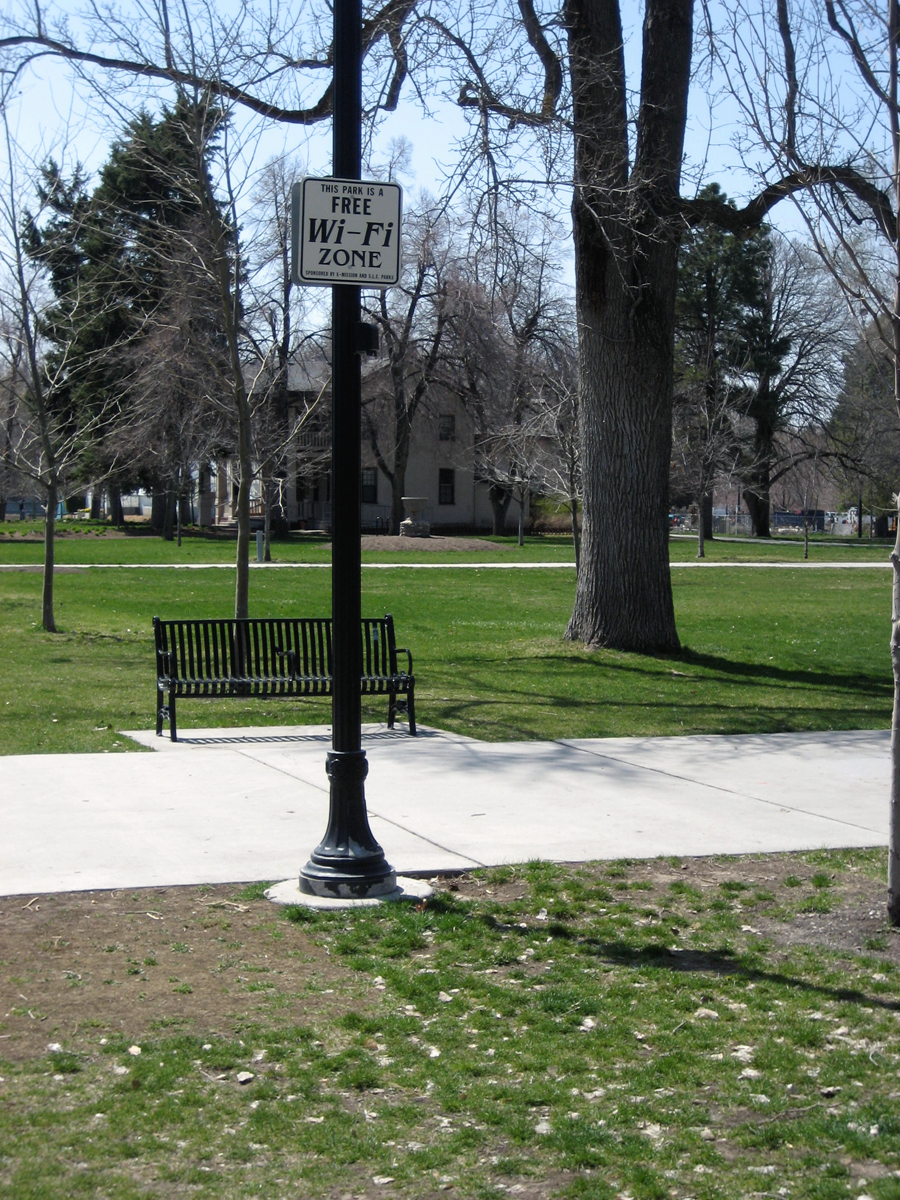
Free Wi-Fi in the park

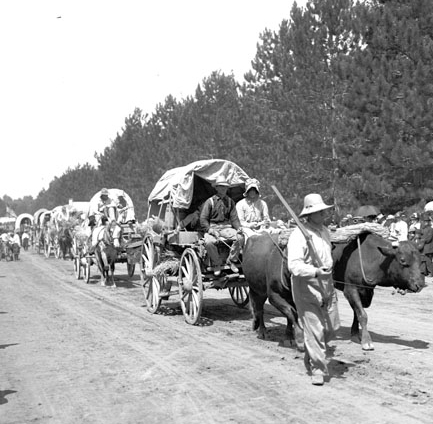
Re-enactment of Mormon pioneers in the 1912 Pioneer Day Parade in Liberty Park

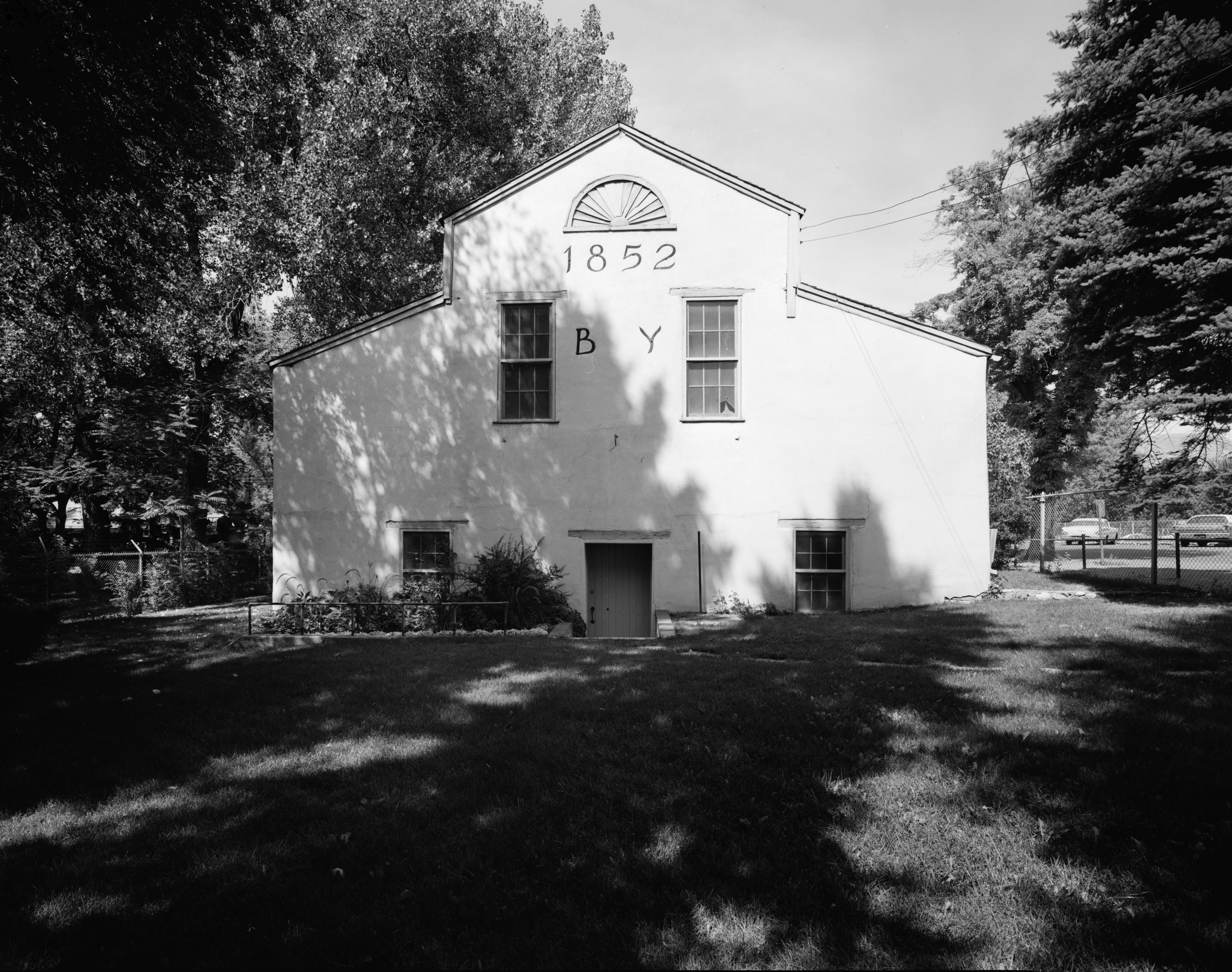
Isaac Chase Mill, August 1968

== See also ==
- National Register of Historic Places listings in Salt Lake City
