= Marilyn Brown Novel Award =

The Marilyn Brown Novel Award was an occasional award given to the best unpublished novel focusing on realistic cultural experiences of the Utah region submitted for consideration. The award includes a $1,000 honorarium.

The award was founded by Marilyn Brown and her husband to encourage quality fiction focused on regional Mormon experience. Beginning in 2000, the award was presented every other year by the Association for Mormon Letters. Beginning with the 2009 award, the Utah Valley University's English Department accepted stewardship over the award. Jen Wahlquist was the professor in charge, and she broadened the award's scope to all fiction about the Utah region with the intent to make it an annual award. The award has a $30,000 endowment.

Upon Walquist's retirement and given a low number of novel submissions, the endowment was repurposed into a scholarship fund for UVU students, and renamed the Marilyn & Bill Brown Endowed Writing Scholarship. The scholarship is managed by the UVU library.

== Past winners ==
2000

- Every Knee Shall Bow (later published as Vernal Promises) by Jack Harrell
  - Honorable Mention: Windows by Dorothy W. Peterson
  - Honorable Mention: Barry Monroe’s Missionary Journal by Alan Rex Mitchell
  - Honorable Mention: The Wildest Waste by Laura Dene Card

2002

- Mormonville by A. Jeff Call

2004

- House Dreams by Janean Justham

2006

- The Coming of Elijah by Arianne Cope
  - Honorable Mention: Seeker by Donald Marshall

2008

- Rift by Todd Robert Petersen
  - Honorable Mention: Voices at the Crossroads by Helynne Hollstein Hansen
  - Honorable Mention: Don't You Marry the Mormon Boys by Janet Kay Jensen

2009

- Avenging Saints by John Bennion

2010

- Across a Harvested Field by Robert Goble

2011

- Putting up Stars by Susan Auten

2012

- Boots and Saddles: A Call to Glory by Paul Colt

2013

- A Boy Scout’s Field Guide to the Red-shifting Universe by Scott Hatch

2014

- Clawing Eagle by Christy Monson
