= Chase Home Museum of Utah Folk Arts =

Museum in Salt Lake City, Utah, US

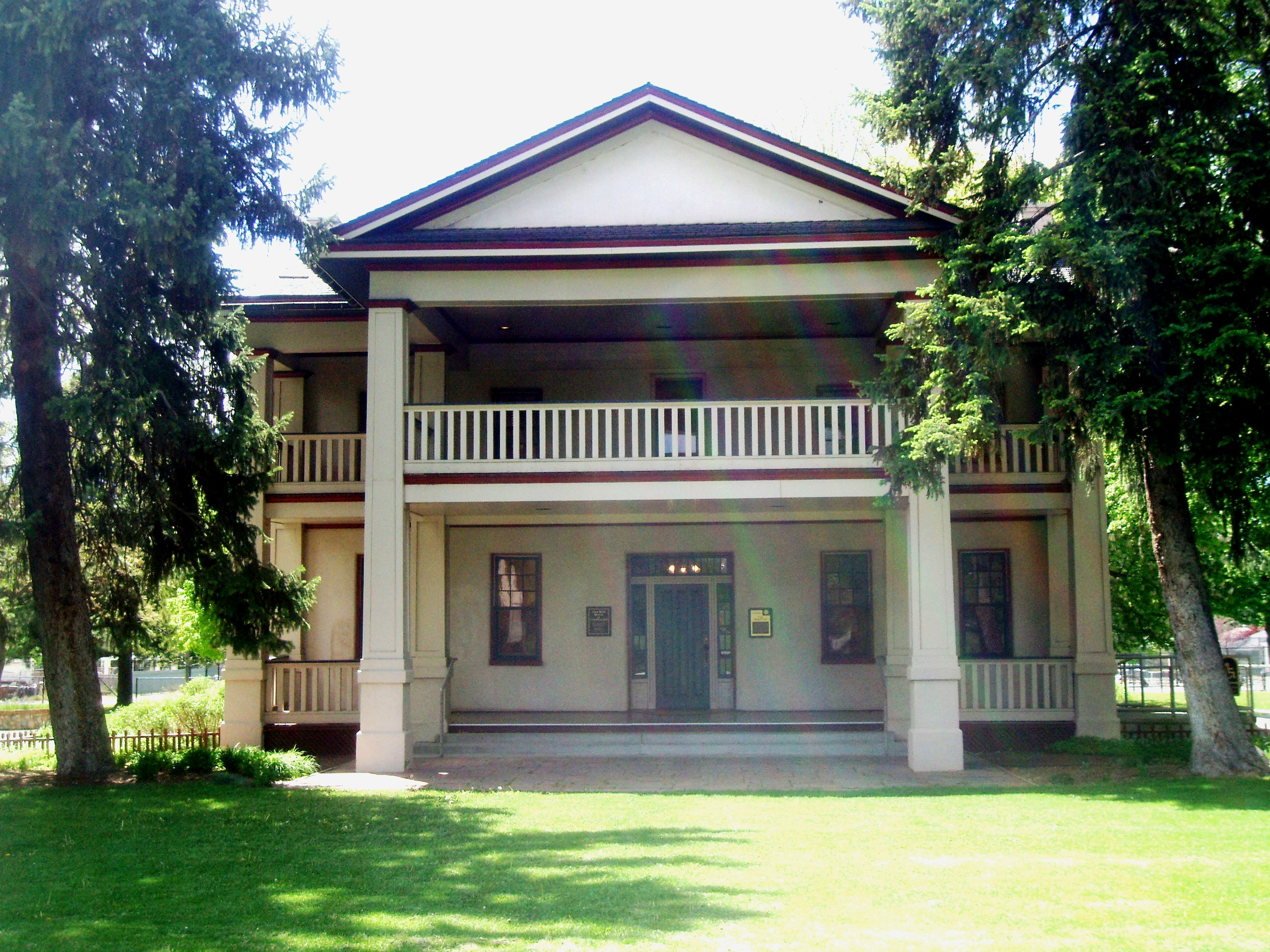
- Established: 1987 (built 1856)
- Location: Liberty Park; 600 East 900 South; Salt Lake City, UT 84105
- Coordinates: 40.7563925°N 111.8985922°W
- Administrator: Rachel Haberman

The Chase Home Museum of Utah Folk Arts is operated by the Utah Division of Arts & Museums, and has been the permanent home of the Utah State Folk Arts Collection since 1987 and is the only museum in the United States that is dedicated to displaying a state-owned collection of contemporary folk art produced by its residents. It is a venue for Utah's diverse artists and communities to share their folk art including: crafts, music, and dance. In addition to rotating exhibits, annual concerts, and hands-on workshops, the Chase Home Museum houses an archive of fieldwork recordings and photographs that document Utah's folk art and traditional culture. The Chase Home Museum currently has three permanent exhibition galleries and one temporary exhibition gallery.

== History ==
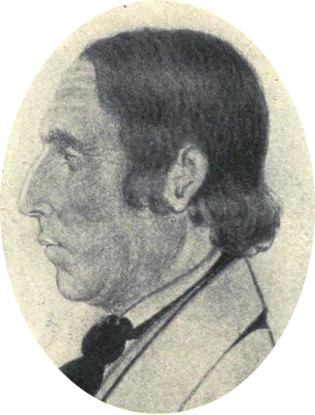
Portrait of Isaac Chase

In 1847, Isaac Chase emigrated to Utah with Mormon pioneers and quickly continued his vocation by building a sawmill and gristmill on the outskirts of the newly formed settlement of Salt Lake City, Utah. In the early 1850s, Mormon leader Brigham Young partnered with Isaac Chase in his milling business as it prospered. At the same time, Isaac Chase built a two-story adobe house near the mills in the center of a 110-acre (0.45 km^{2}) farm. The Chase Home is a traditional two-story central-passage floor plan made of adobe bricks that were manufactured behind the home. Several changes have been made to the home over the years, most notably the additional of a rear cross-wing that functioned as a kitchen and a two-story portico to the front facade that emphasized the Greek Revival style of the building. The Chase Home was known as a gathering place for pioneers, leaders of the Church of Jesus Christ of Latter-day Saints, and young people in search of entertainment. In 1882 that farm was gifted to the State of Utah and became known as Liberty Park.

== Folk Art Collection ==
The Chase Home Museum of Utah Folk Arts is the only museum in the United States that is dedicated to displaying a state-owned collection of contemporary folk art produced by Utah residents. A large portion of the collection comes from Utah's Native American population who used wood, willow, buckskin, beads, porcupine quills, shells and sequins to make things like baskets, cradleboards, clothing, jewelry, kachina dolls, drums and flutes. Utah's American Indian population includes those affiliated with land-based resident tribes—the linguistically related Goshute, Northern Ute, Paiute, Shoshone, Ute Mountain Ute and the Athabaskan-speaking Navajos—and those from other tribal groups who have chosen Utah as their home.

The collection also includes many items created by people who came to Utah through immigration and refugee programs. Although many traditional arts are modified or lost when people migrate from one society to the other, the most meaningful and symbolic folk art often persists. Folk arts focused on religious belief, identity, and community celebration are the most common. The folk art collection at the Chase Home Museum includes wood carvings, pottery, jewelry, baskets, textiles, and sculptures with roots in European, Asian, Hispanic, Polynesian, and African cultures.

Other contemporary folk art in the collection at the Chase Home Museum include occupational folk art. Occupational folk art refers to items that are created for functional use in one's occupation, but often also reflect the aesthetics of the creator. Sometimes these items are created as decorative pieces to commemorate their occupational heritage and celebrate the skills that created them. Examples of occupational folk art in the collection include: stone carving, blacksmithing, saddle making, horsehair hitching, and woodworking.

== Location ==
Liberty Park, located in Salt Lake City between 900 South and 1300 South and 500 East and 700 East, is the second largest park in Salt Lake City, Utah. The Chase Home Museum of Utah Folk Arts is located just west of the park's center.

== See also ==
- List of museums in Utah
- List of the oldest buildings in Utah
- Mormon art
- National and ethnic cultures of Utah
- Folk Art
