= Robert Gardner Jr. House =

Historic house in Millcreek, Utah, United States

- U.S. National Register of Historic Places
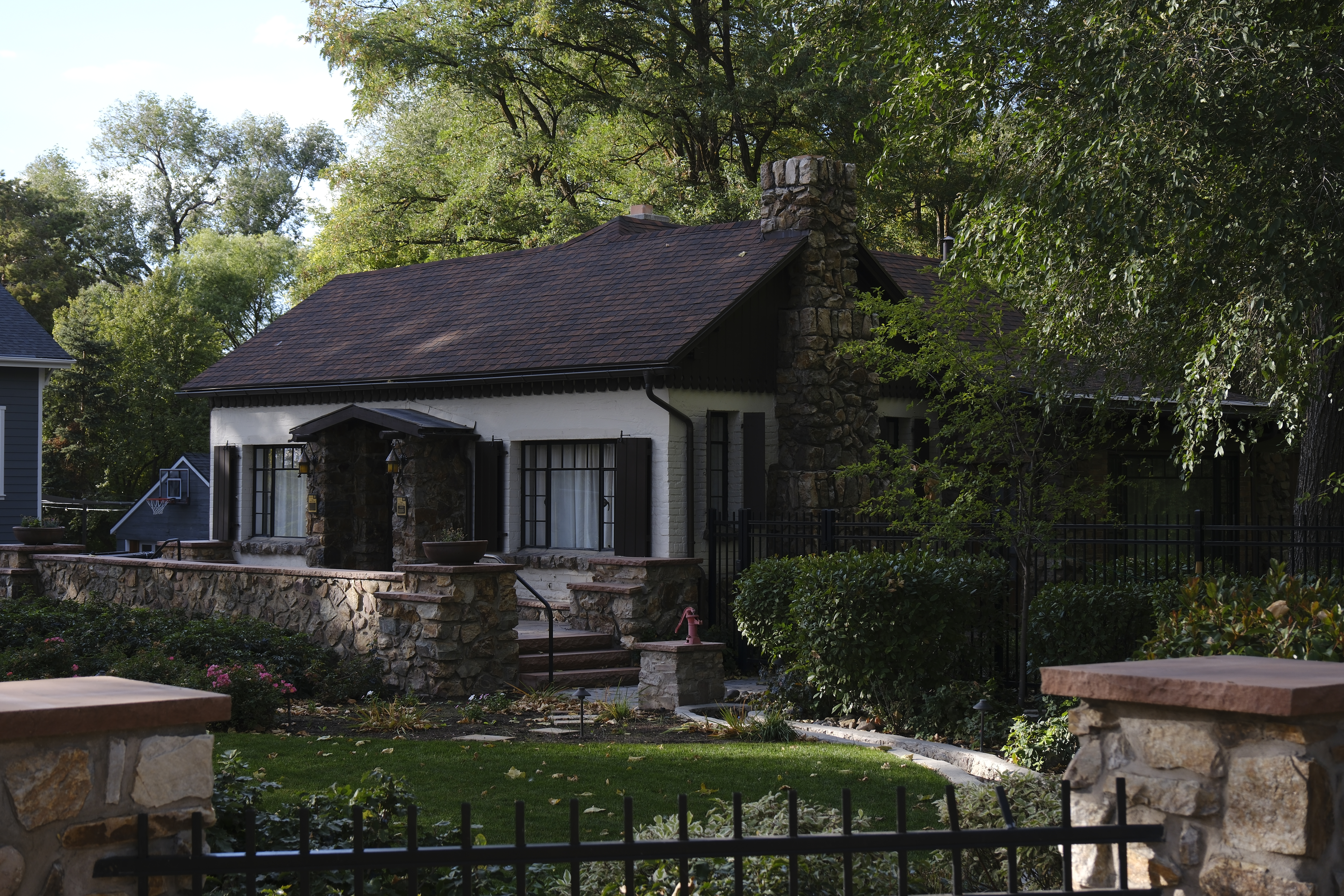
- Robert Gardner Jr. House, October 2024

- Location within Utah Location within the United States
- Location: 1475 East Murphy's Lane; Miillcreek, Utah; United States
- Coordinates: 40.693072°N 111.849149°W
- Architectural style: Queen Anne
- NRHP reference No.: 100001441
- Added to NRHP: January 18, 2018

The Robert Gardner Jr. House, is a historic residence in Millcreek, Utah, United States, is a that is listed on the National Register of Historic Places (NRHP).

== Description ==
The house is located at 1475 East Murphy's Lane in Millcreek. Built in 1848, is likely the oldest standing European American structure in the state of Utah, dating to the year of the Mexican Cession of the Alta California region to the United States following the Mexican-American War.

Robert Gardner Jr. was born in Scotland and kept a journal during his time in Utah which survives.

The house was listed on the NRHP January 18, 2018.

== See also ==
- National Register of Historic Places listings in Salt Lake County, Utah
- List of the oldest buildings in Utah
