= Pioneer Day =

Holiday in Utah, United States

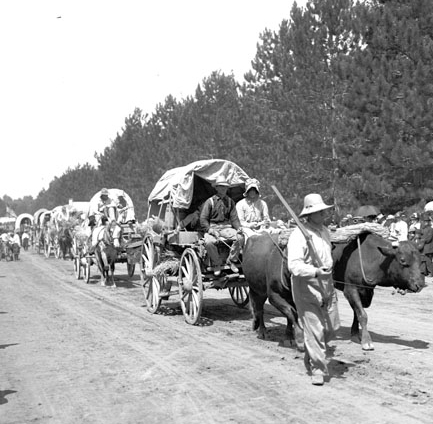
- Re-enactment of Mormon pioneers in the 1912 Pioneer Day Parade at Liberty Park, Salt Lake City, Utah
- Observed by: Utah, United States and Latter-day Saints worldwide
- Significance: Commemorates the first entry of Brigham Young and a group of Mormon pioneers into the Salt Lake Valley on July 24, 1847
- Celebrations: Parades, fireworks, rodeos, and other festivities
- Date: July 24
- Next time: July 24, 2027
- Frequency: Annual

Pioneer Day is an official holiday celebrated on July 24 in the U.S. state of Utah, with some celebrations taking place in regions of surrounding states originally settled by Mormon pioneers. It commemorates the entry of Brigham Young and the first group of Mormon pioneers into the Salt Lake Valley on July 24, 1847, where the Latter-day Saints settled after being forced from Nauvoo, Illinois, and other locations in the eastern United States. Parades, fireworks, rodeos, and other festivities help commemorate the event. Similar to July 4, many local and all state-run government offices and many businesses are closed on Pioneer Day.

In addition to being an official holiday in Utah, Pioneer Day is considered a special occasion by many members of the Church of Jesus Christ of Latter-day Saints (LDS Church). On Pioneer Day, some Latter-day Saints walk portions of the Mormon Trail or reenact entering the Salt Lake Valley by handcart. Latter-day Saints throughout the United States and around the world may celebrate July 24 in remembrance of the LDS Church's pioneer era, with songs, dances, potlucks, and pioneer related activities.

A 2013 Pioneer Day parade in Monroe, Utah

Winners of a Pioneer Day pie contest are announced in Provo in 2018.

While the holiday has strong links to the LDS Church, it is officially a celebration for everyone, regardless of faith and nationality, who immigrated to the Salt Lake Valley during the pioneer era, which is generally considered to have ended with the 1869 arrival of the transcontinental railroad. Notable non-LDS American pioneers from this period include Episcopal Bishop Daniel S. Tuttle, who was responsible for Utah's first non-Mormon schools (Rowland Hall-St. Mark's) and first public hospital (St. Mark's) in the late 19th century. The Intertribal Powwow at Liberty Park in Salt Lake City honors the cultural heritage and contributions of the area's Native Americans, helping Utahns to gain a deeper understanding of the region's history.

== History ==
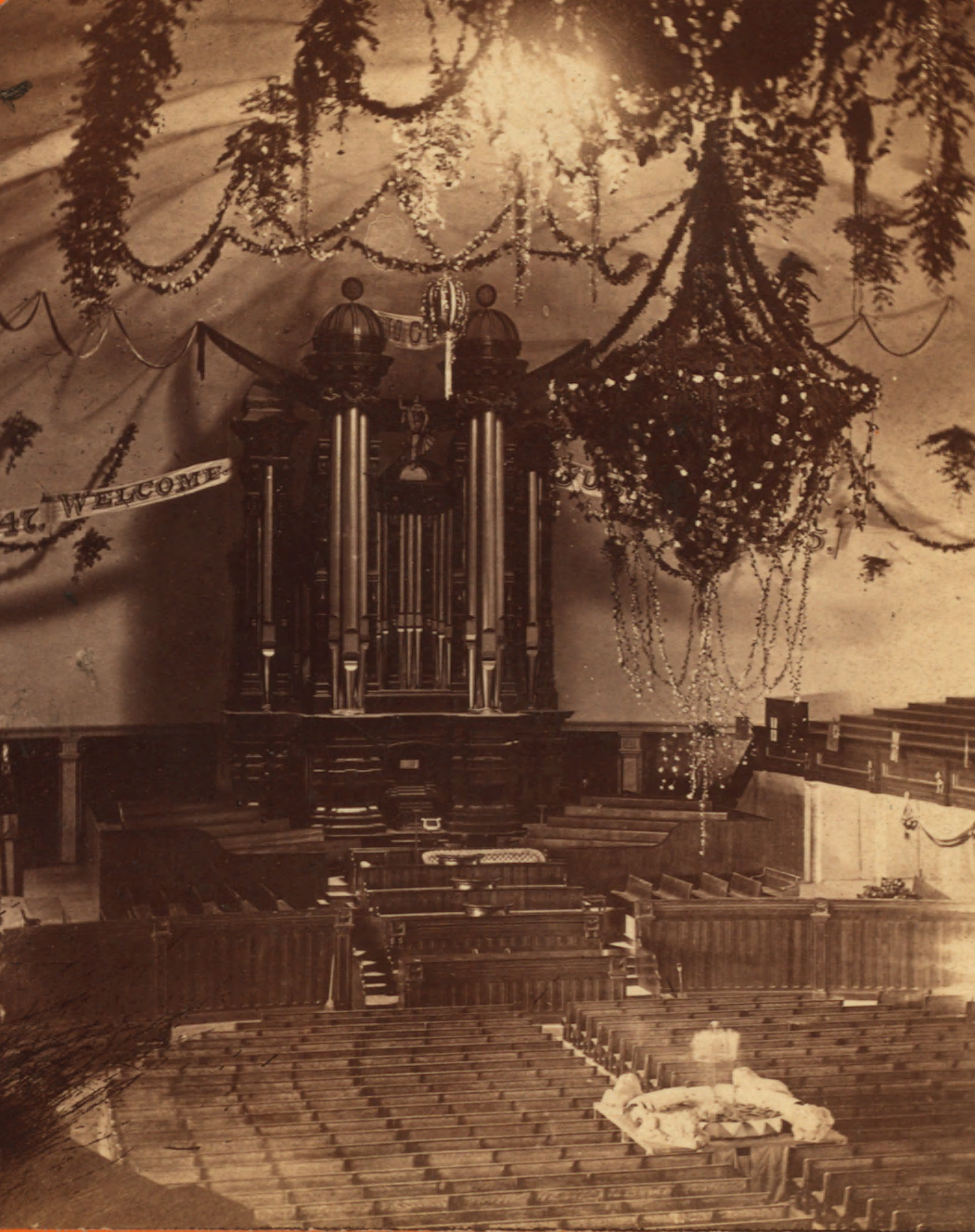
The interior of the Salt Lake Tabernacle as decorated for the Deseret Sunday School Union's July 1875 Pioneer Day celebration.

The first celebration of what is now known as Pioneer Day occurred on July 24, 1849, when the Nauvoo Brass Band led a commemoration of the second anniversary of the Latter-day Saints entering the Salt Lake Valley. This celebration also included a cannon firing, a procession, speeches, musical numbers, displaying a national flag, reading the Declaration of Independence, toasts, and a community meal. All of these elements were also typical of Independence Day celebrations of the nineteenth century. (The holiday was simply called the Twenty-Fourth of July until the 1870s, when it began to be known as Pioneer Day.)

The celebration of Pioneer Day in 1857 was interrupted with news of the approach of Johnston's Army, heralding the beginning of the Utah War. Immediately following the occupation of the Utah Territory by federal troops, Pioneer Day was sparsely celebrated. Pioneer Day continually expanded into the surrounding areas as the Mormon Corridor spread throughout the Intermountain West. In 1880, Latter-day Saints commemorated the Golden Jubilee of the church's formal organization in 1830; tens of thousands of people in hundreds of communities participated in enthusiastic celebrations.

In the years that followed, federal enforcement efforts of anti-polygamy laws (including the 1882 Edmunds Act) resulted in greatly subdued celebrations. The 1886 commemoration was particularly notable for its mourning theme, with the Salt Lake Tabernacle decorated in black instead of the usually colorful bunting, and the eulogizing of Latter-day Saints who were in hiding or imprisoned for polygamy offenses. By 1897, the celebration included not only the 50th anniversary of the initial arrival in the Salt Lake Valley, but also the end of the polygamy issue, the completion of the Salt Lake Temple, and statehood for Utah.

The centennial in 1947 and the sesquicentennial in 1997 were especially large celebrations in Utah. One writer indicated that the 1947 celebrations seemed to incorporate the entire year, with July 24 only being an apex to the events.

The holiday generates a great deal of road traffic; Utah Department of Public Safety statistics states Pioneer Day has the second highest holiday traffic fatality rate in Utah, with the earlier July 4 Independence Day having the highest rate.

The holiday has received criticism for its lack of inclusiveness for non-Mormons. As a result, a small, growing contingent has started celebrating Pie and Beer Day instead of the traditional Pioneer Day. Pie and Beer day is a play on words: "pie and beer" sounds like "pioneer". Pie and Beer Day was created as a counter culture alternative.

== See also ==
- Days of '47 Parade, part of Salt Lake City's celebration of Pioneer Day
- Mormon folklore: Pioneer Day
- This Is the Place Heritage Park
- This is the Place Monument
- Utah…This Is The Place
