= Jack Harrell =

American writer and academic

- Born: November 23, 1961 (age 64)
- Education: PhD, Education, University of Idaho (2006)
- Occupations: English Professor, Brigham Young University–Idaho

Jack Aaron Harrell (born November 23, 1961) is an American fiction writer, essayist, and English professor at Brigham Young University–Idaho.

== Early life and education ==
Harrell was raised in the small farming community of Parkersburg, Illinois. After high school, he moved to Vernal, Utah, where he was baptized a member of The Church of Jesus Christ of Latter-day Saints. He earned his bachelor's degree in English from Brigham Young University (1992), his master's degree in English from Illinois State University (1994), and his PhD in education from the University of Idaho (2006).

== Career ==
While studying at Brigham Young University in 1990, Harrell wrote his first short story, “A Sense of Order.” He began to write his novel Vernal Promises in a fiction class at Brigham Young University and won the Marilyn Brown Novel Award in 2000 for the unpublished manuscript. Vernal Promises was published by Signature Books in 2003. In 2010, Signature published his book A Sense of Order and Other Stories, which contains the award-winning stories "Calling and Election" and "A Prophet's Story." His book Writing Ourselves: Essays on Creativity, Craft, and Mormonism was published by Greg Kofford Books in 2016 and won the Association for Mormon Letters Award for Criticism. His latest novel, Caldera Ridge, was published in July 2018. His short story, "The Boy Comes Home," was published by Wayfare in 2024 and won the AML award for Short Fiction.

In addition to his writing, Harrell served for five years as co-editor for Irreantum, a quarterly publication of the Association for Mormon Letters. Harrell has also served as the composition director in the English Department at Brigham Young University–Idaho, where he has taught since 1995.

== Bibliography ==
- Vernal Promises (novel, 2003)
- A Sense of Order and Other Short Stories (2010)
- Writing Ourselves: Essays on Creativity, Craft, and Mormonism (2016)
- Caldera Ridge (novel, 2018)

== Writing Themes ==
Harrell's writing often addresses the challenges of being a writer and a believer, of juxtaposing aesthetics with the constraints of institutional religion. He said of the writing process, "The interaction a teacher has with other people is always helpful to the writing life. Among other things, a writer has to be an amateur psychologist. Dealing with a variety of people and watching their lives unfold provide all kinds of valuable insights." In his essay, "What Violence in Literature Must Teach us," he added, "Out of the countless and arbitrary experiences of life, the writer selects those that can be ordered into a story, a story with consistent characters, driven by an overarching theme. From the spelling of the words and the grammar of the sentences to the order of the chapters and the working out of a coherent plot, the writer transforms chaos into order. And along comes the reader, hungry to vicariously experience the conflict but also anxious to see if or when the struggle of the story—a struggle that might parallel the conflicts in his or her own life—will come to rest, to conclusion, to order."
