= Hovenweep National Monument =

US national monument

- IUCN category III (natural monument or feature)
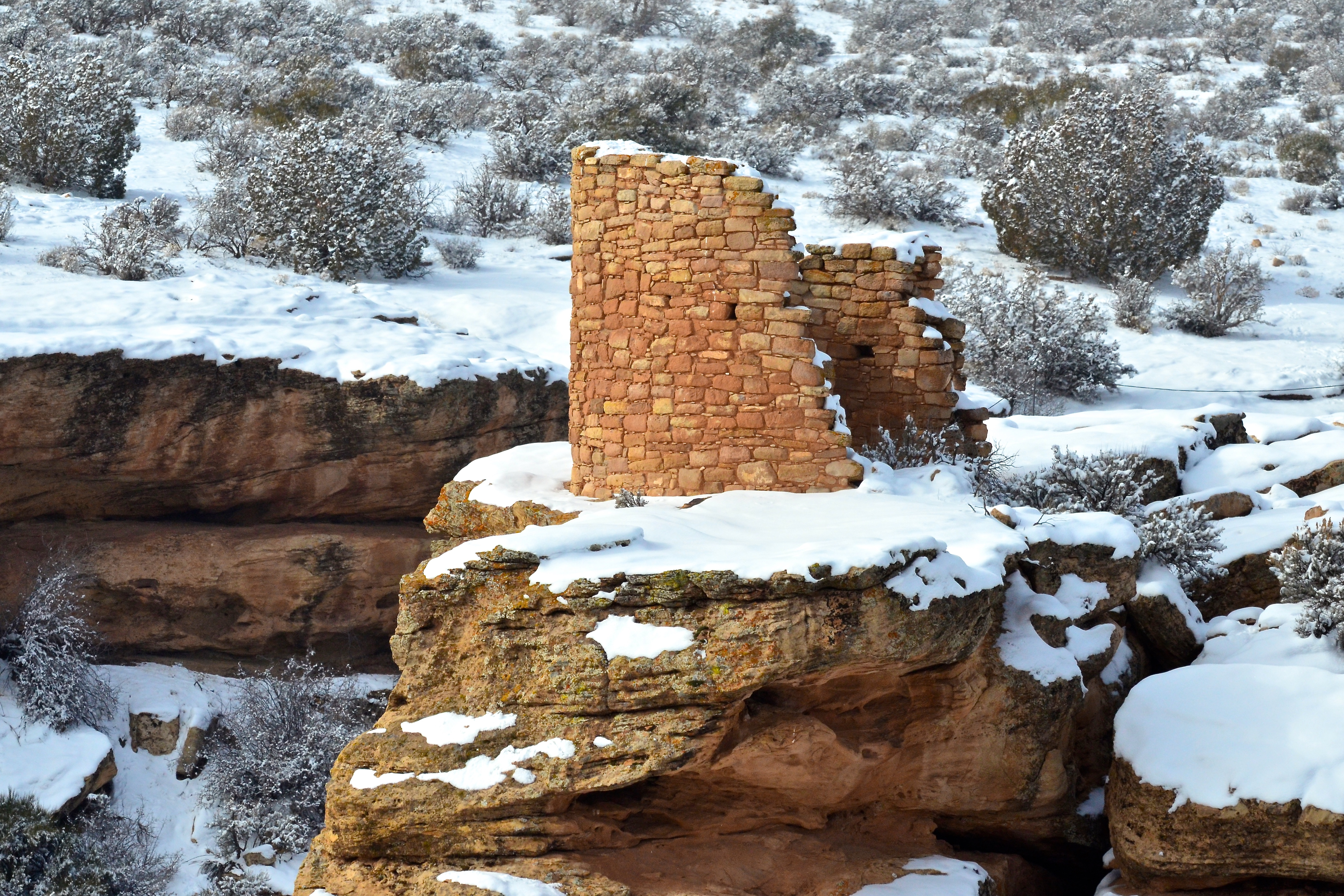
- Horseshoe Tower in the snow

- Location within Utah Location within the United States
- Interactive map of Hovenweep National Monument
- Location: Montezuma County, Colorado & San Juan County, Utah, USA
- Nearest city: Bluff, Utah, Blanding, Utah
- Coordinates: 37.38389°N 109.07722°W
- Area: 784 acres (317 ha)
- Created: March 2, 1923
- Visitors: 26,616 (in 2025)
- Governing body: U.S. National Park Service
- Website: Hovenweep National Monument

Hovenweep National Monument is located on land in southwestern Colorado and southeastern Utah, between Cortez, Colorado and Blanding, Utah on the Cajon Mesa of the Great Sage Plain. Shallow tributaries run through the wide and deep canyons into the San Juan River.

Although Hovenweep National Monument is largely known for the six groups of Ancestral Puebloan villages and its kiva, there is evidence of occupation by hunter-gatherers from 8,000 to 6,000 B.C. until about AD 200. Later, a succession of early puebloan cultures settled in the area and remained until the 14th century.

Hovenweep became a National Monument in 1923 and is administered by the National Park Service. In July 2014, the International Dark-Sky Association designated Hovenweep an International Dark Sky Park.

== History ==
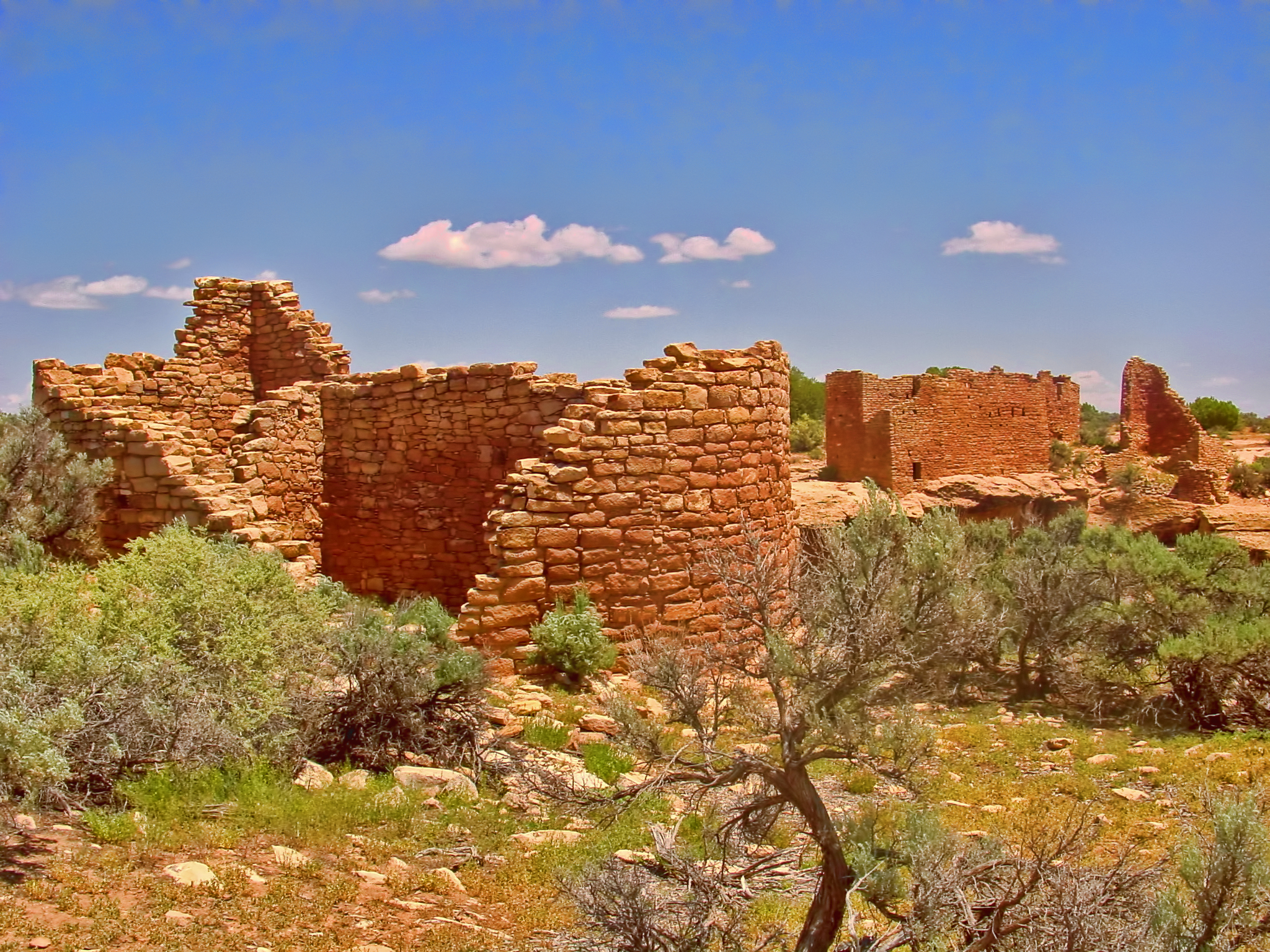
Hovenweep House

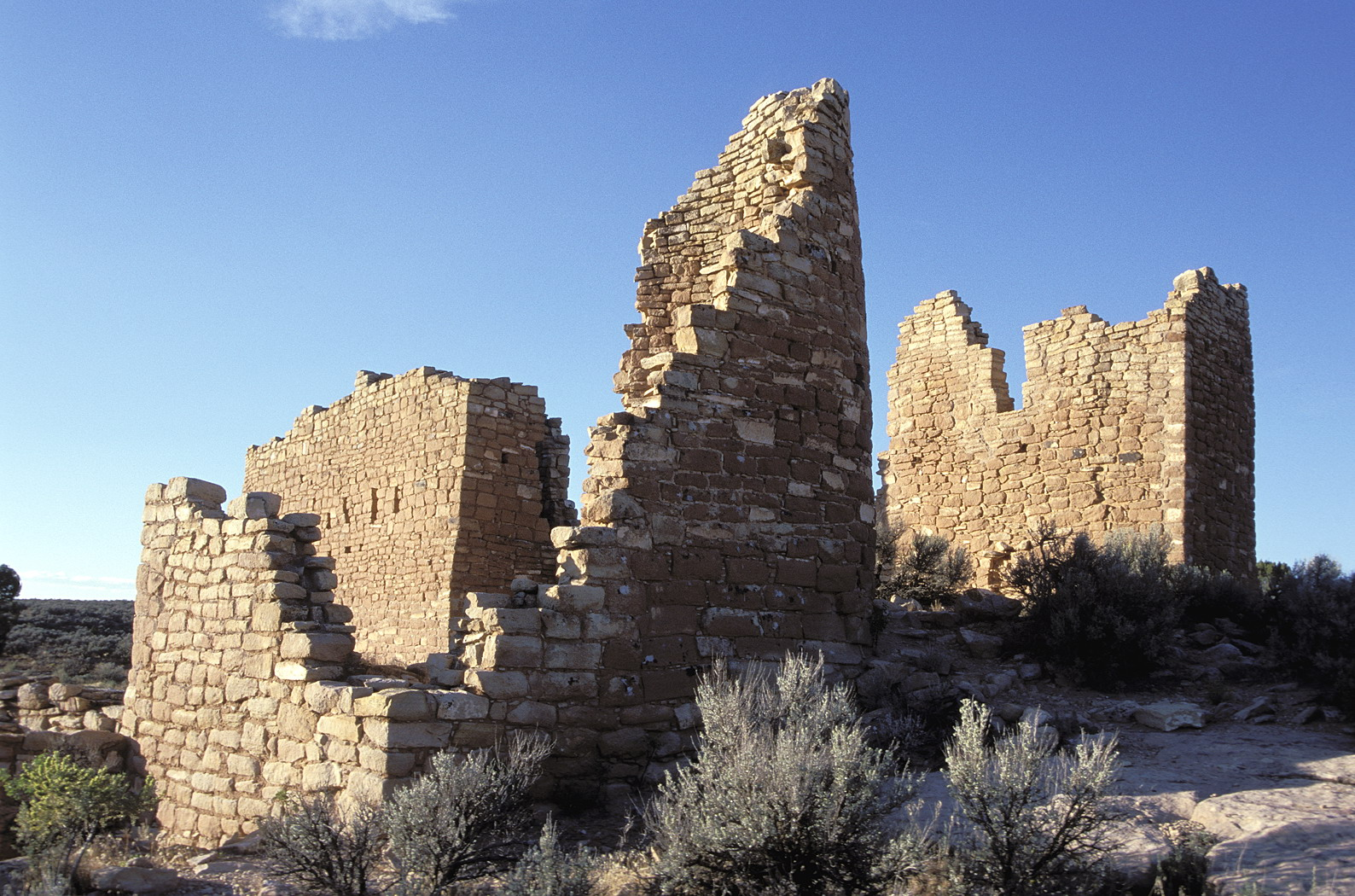
Hovenweep Castle

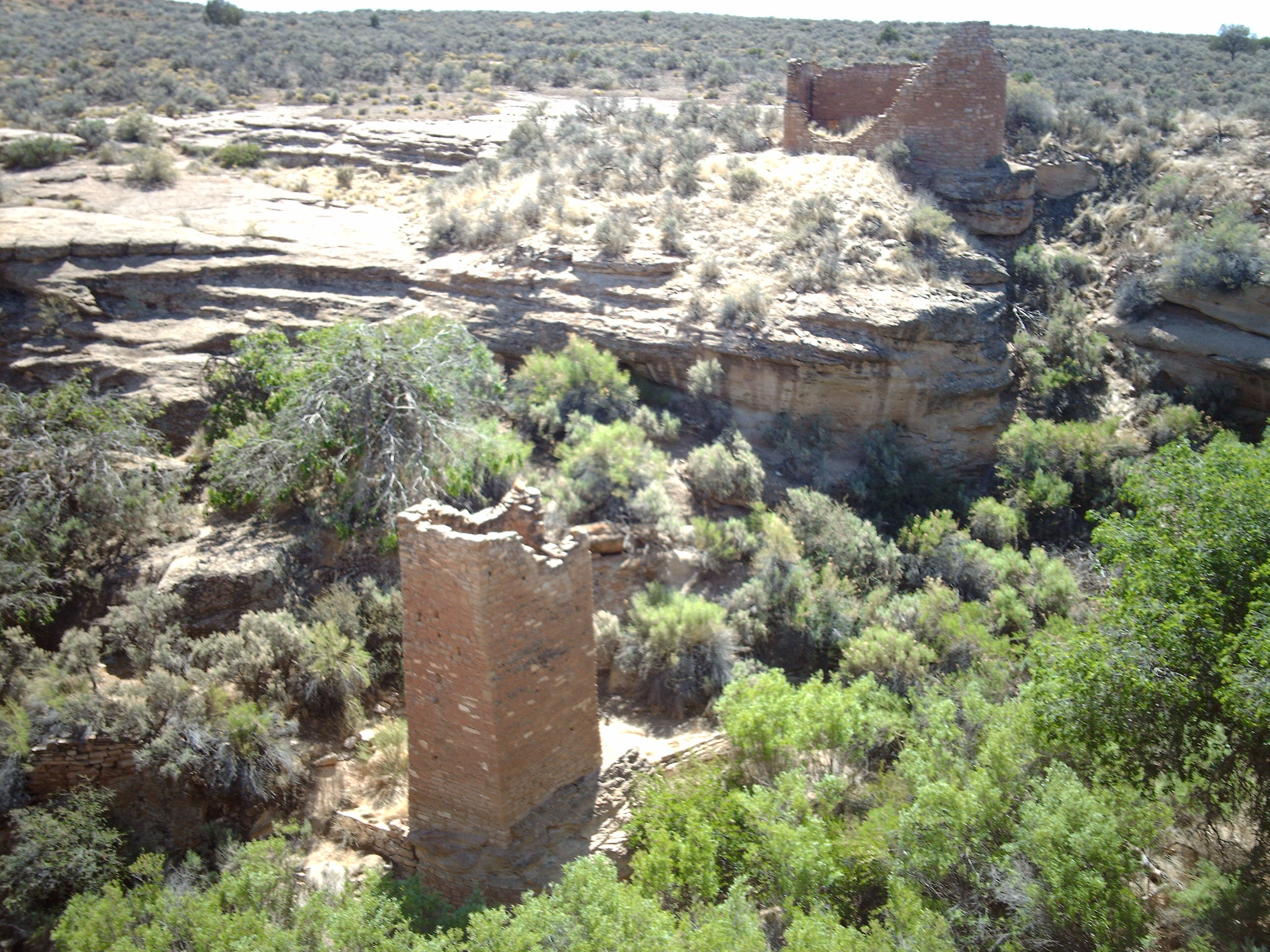
Square Tower

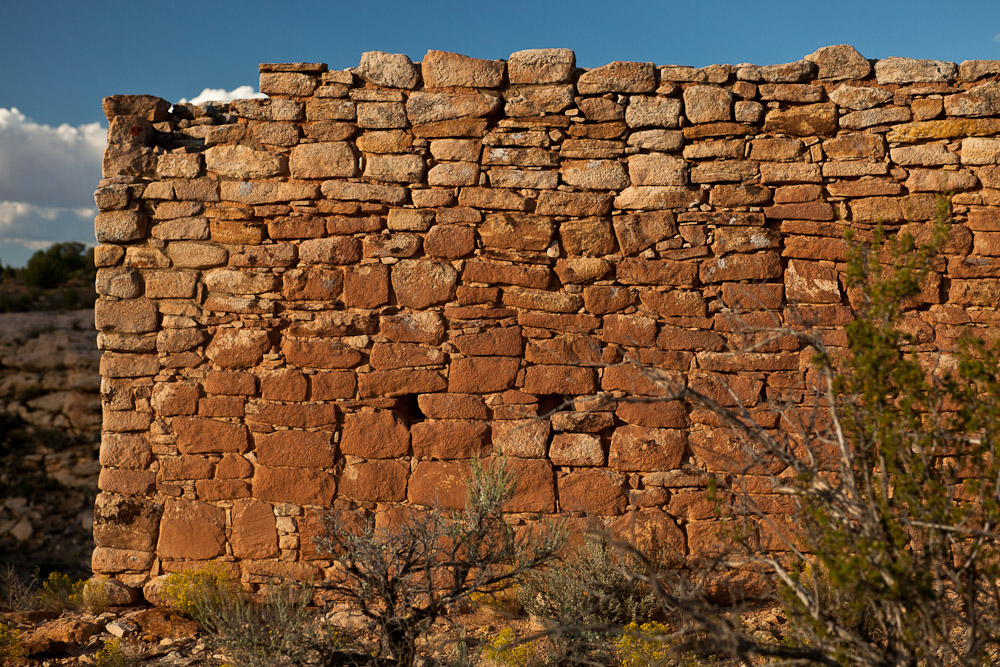
Rim Rock House Masonry

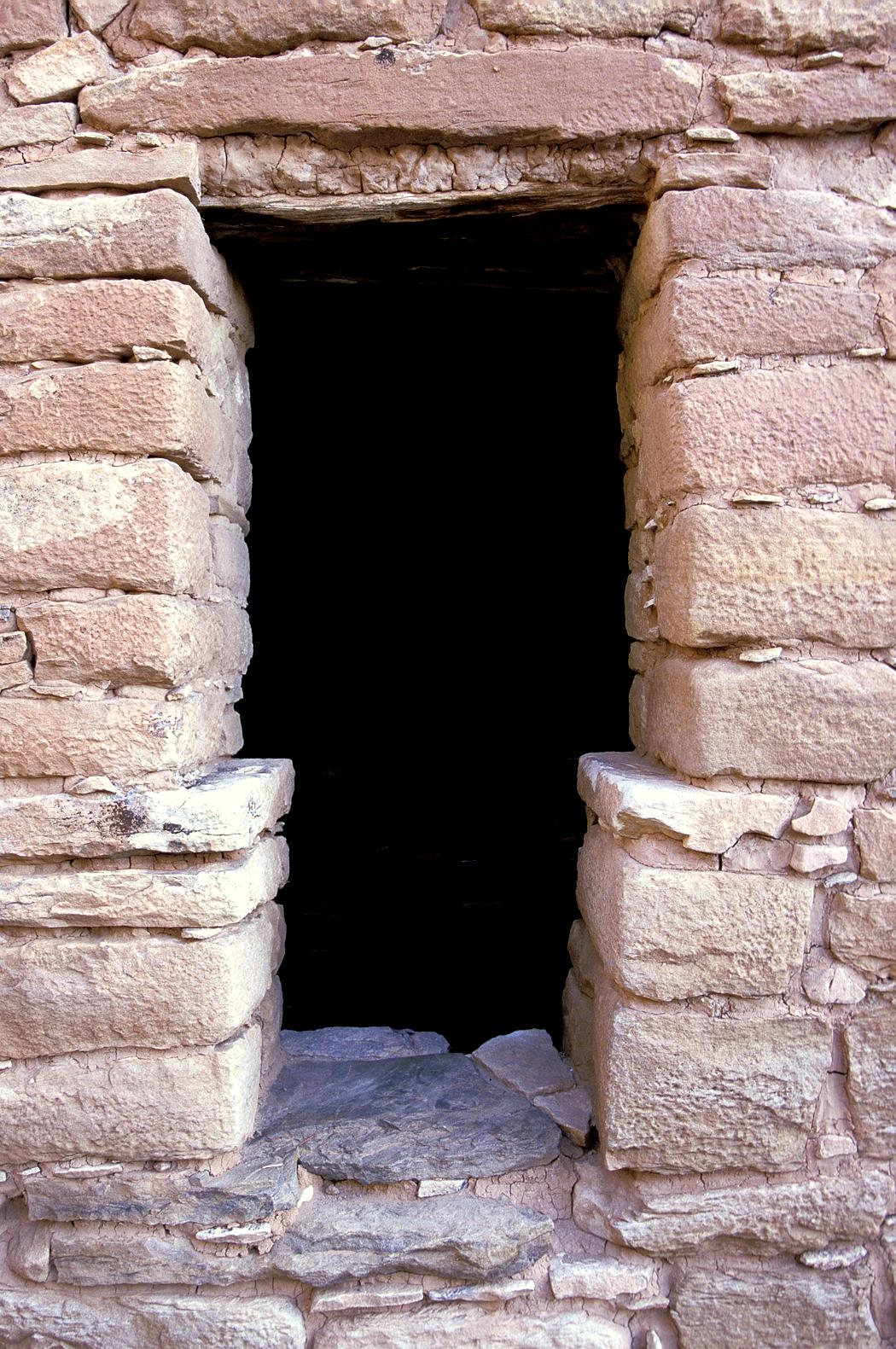
Square Tower doorway

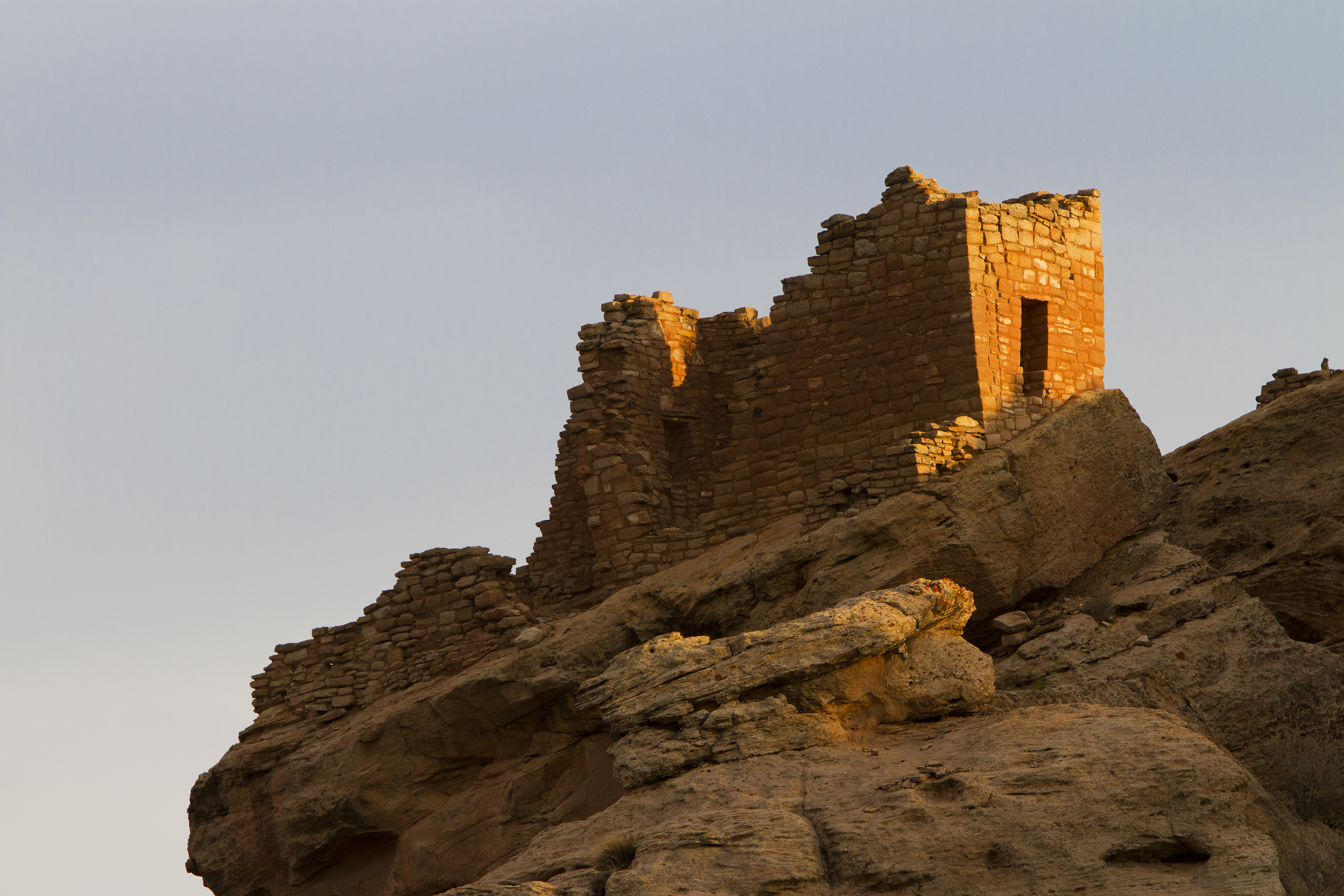
Stronghold House – Square Tower Group

=== Early people ===
Evidence from the area indicates that there were Paleo-Indians and people of the Archaic period. During the transitional period from a traditional hunter-gatherer society to pueblo people, there were several distinct cultural changes:

Early hunters

Hunter-gatherers from 10,000 years Before Present hunted and lived in a difficult terrain, traversed deep canyons and areas of few animals and limited vegetation, and managed limited access to water – which made life difficult and limited the size of their hunt groups. They were adaptive to find sufficient food, supplementing their diet with nuts, seeds and fruit from wild plants. Artifacts were found 1) of Paleo-Indians who camped and hunted along the Cajon Mesa of Hovenweep as early as 8,000 BC and 2) from 20 sites with evidence of Archaic-Early Basketmaker people from about 6,000 BC.

Late Basketmaker II period AD 50 to 500

The people living in the Four Corners region were introduced to maize and basketry through Mesoamerican trading about 2,000 years ago. Able to have greater control of their diet through cultivation, the hunter-gatherers lifestyle became more sedentary as small dispersed groups began cultivating maize and squash. They also continued to hunt and gather wild plants.

They were named "Basketmakers" for their skill in making baskets for storing food, covering with pitch to heat water, and using to toast seeds and nuts. They wove bags, sandals, belts out of yucca plants and leaves – and strung beads. They occasionally lived in dry caves where they dug pits and lined with stones to store food. These people were ancestors of the pueblo people of the Hovenweep pueblo settlement and Mesa Verde.

Basketmaker III period 500 to 750

The next era, Modified Basketmakers, resulted in the introduction of pottery which reduced the number of baskets that they made and eliminated the creation of woven bags. The simple, gray pottery allowed them a better tool for cooking and storage. Beans were added to the cultivated diet. Bows and arrows made hunting easier and thus the acquisition of hides for clothing. Turkey feathers were woven into blankets and robes. On the rim of Mesa Verde, small groups built pit houses which were built several feet below the surface with elements suggestive of the introduction of celebration rituals.

Pueblo I period 750 to 900

From pueblos at Mesa Verde we learn of some advancements during this period which are reflected in the Hovenweep structures built in the next cultural period. Pueblo buildings were built with stone, windows facing south, and in U, E and L shapes. The buildings were placed more closely together and reflected deepening religious celebration. Towers were built near kivas and likely used for look-outs. Pottery became more versatile, not just for cooking, but now included pitchers, ladles, bowls, jars and dishware for food and drink. White pottery with black designs emerged, the pigments coming from plants. Water management and conservation techniques, including the use of reservoirs and silt-retaining dams also emerged during this period.

=== Ancient Puebloan people ===
Pueblo II period – 900–1150

About 900, the number of Hovenweep residential sites increased. Like the people at Mesa Verde and Canyon de Chelly National Monument, about 1100 the Hovenweep village communities moved from mesa tops to the heads of canyons.

People, generally considered part of the Mesa Verde branch of the northern San Juan Pueblo (Anasazi) culture, transitioned from disperse housing and built pueblos in the late 12th century alongside springs or other water sources near or at the canyon heads. Most of the pueblo building was conducted, about the same time as the Mesa Verde cliff dwellings, between 1230 and 1275 when there were about 2,500 residents. The Hovenweep architecture and pottery was like that of Mesa Verde.

Pueblo III period – 1150–1350

The Hovenweep inhabitants completed construction over a period of time. Buildings with one story towers were built about 1000. By about 1160, they began building larger pueblo residential complexes, up to 3-story towers, dams, and reservoirs. They moved their fields into areas where water could be controlled. They also built large stone towers, living quarters and other shelters to safeguard springs and seeps. The stone course pueblos and towers of the Hovenweep people exhibit expert masonry skills and engineering. The builders did not level foundations for their structures, but adapted construction designs to the uneven surfaces of rock slabs. These stone pueblos were understandably referred to as castles by 19th-century explorers. Prominent structures are Hovenweep Castle, Hovenweep House, Square Tower, Rim Rock House, Twin Towers, Stronghold House and Unit-type house. These structures are part of larger community pueblos that surround the heads of canyons where springs are located.

Two murals from Hovenweep were excavated and conserved prior to area construction. The kiva murals, which provide great insight into the life of the Ancient people, are now at the Canyons of the Ancients Visitor Center and Museum. Warren Hurley describes them as "some of the best preserved examples of Pueblo III wall paintings in the Northern San Juan Region".

Six clusters of pueblo buildings

Cajon Group, constructed like the Holly, Hackberry and Horseshoe configuration, is at the head of Allen Canyon. It consists of a cluster of room blocks and the remains of a tower, estimated to house 80–100 people, that was constructed on a boulder that sits below the rim of the canyon. There are up to seven kiva depressions around the spring. Remnants of wall alignments below the rim on the talus represent possible terrace farming.

Cutthroat Castle group is in an offshoot of Hovenweep Canyon. Cutthroat Castle, the largest of the remains, is on the north side of the stream. Cutthroat is unique among the units due to the lack of a spring, the numerous kivas and the fact that much of the architecture sits below the rim.

Goodman Point group, the largest and easternmost village, contains small and large clusters of pueblo buildings built partially underground. It was most heavily populated in between 1150–1300, the Pueblo III period. Earlier residents include Basketmakers from 200–450 and during the second Pueblo period 900–1150. (Note: The Hovenweep Visitor's Guide published by the National Park Service does not include Goodman Point, but it is included on the National Park Service website for Hovenweep.)

The Holly group is at the head of Keeley Canyon. Holly is the site known for a rock art panel that has been interpreted as a summer solstice marker. The five named buildings at the site are Curved Wall House, Great House, Holly Tower, Isolated Boulder House and Tilted Tower.

Hackberry and Horseshoe group Hackberry was a medium sized Pueblo III village in the east fork of Bridge Canyon. About 250 to 350 inhabitants are thought to have resided in the Hackberry Group. Located about 500 yards/metres away, the Horseshoe group consists of four pueblo buildings that form a U-shape. Horseshoe Ruin had a dam at the rim to create a reservoir. Horseshoe House is a D-shaped structure containing three rooms surrounding a possible central kiva. The architectural style suggests ceremonial or public use. About 800 years ago the buildings were constructed with "precisely fit" stones and set with mortar of sand, ash, clay and water.

Square Tower group is the largest collection of pueblo buildings at Hovenweep and was populated with up to 500 people. It is in Little Ruin Canyon which is made up of Square Tower, Tower Point, and Twin Towers ruin groups. Towers at Hovenweep were built in a variety of shapes; D-shapes, squares, ovals and circles and for several purposes, including tool and grinding work areas, kivas for ritual functions, residential rooms and storage. Towers have limited access, contain few windows and many have narrow slots or peepholes placed in the walls. The slots and doors of Hovenweep Castle, in Square Tower Group, have been shown to define an apparent solar calendar. The building is aligned so that light is channeled through openings into the building at sunset of the summer solstice, the winter solstice and the spring and fall equinox. The light falls in a predictable pattern on interior door lintels.

Agriculture

Domesticated crops such as maize, amaranth, beans, squash and cotton were grown in terraced fields, and vital water was dammed and flowed to edible wild plants such as beeweed, cattail, sedges, ground cherry, milkweed, and wolf berry.

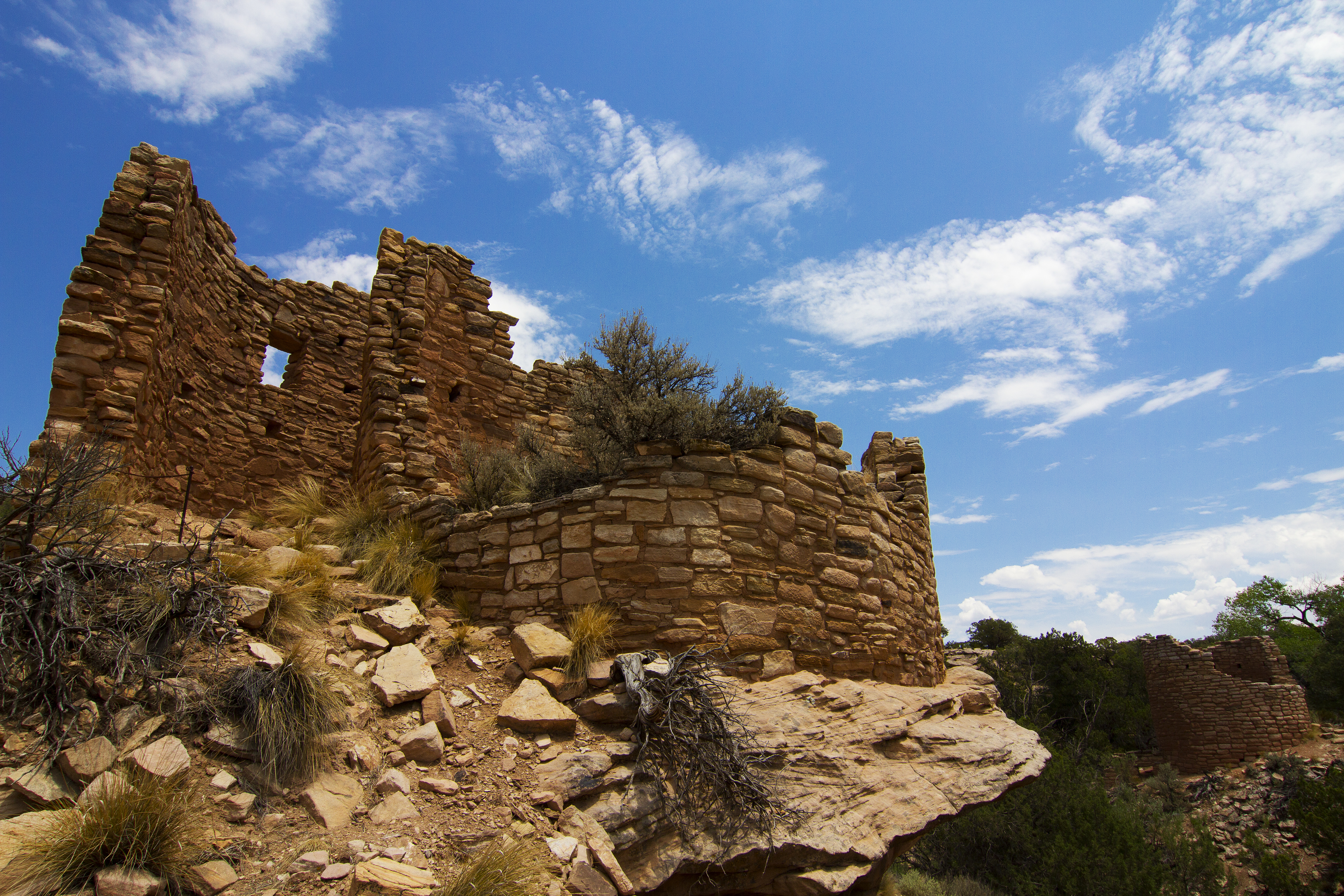
Cutthroat Castle

Researchers studying prehistoric diets have found sagebrush flowers, seeds, and leaves in the Puebloans' waste. As a minor part of their diet, sagebrush would have been a good source of iron and Vitamin C. In larger amounts, it kills intestinal parasites.

Natural resources

The area surrounding Hovenweep supplied a number of materials to support the Hovenweep people's lifestyle. Trees were used for building materials and fires. Baskets were sealed with piñon sap. Clothing and sandals were made from juniper bark. Tools, such as projectile points for hunting, scrapers and knives were made from quartz stones.

Migration from Hovenweep

These construction and water related activities lead archaeologists to speculate that climatic change and increased population placed the communities under stress. The Hovenweep people left their pueblos in the late 13th century, possibly in response to a 23-year regional drought. People in the entire Four Corners region were also abandoning smaller communities at that time, and the area may have been nearly empty by 1350. Archaeological and cultural evidence leads scientists to believe people from this region migrated south to live with the Hopi of Arizona and the puebloan people of the Rio Grande in New Mexico.

== Discovery ==
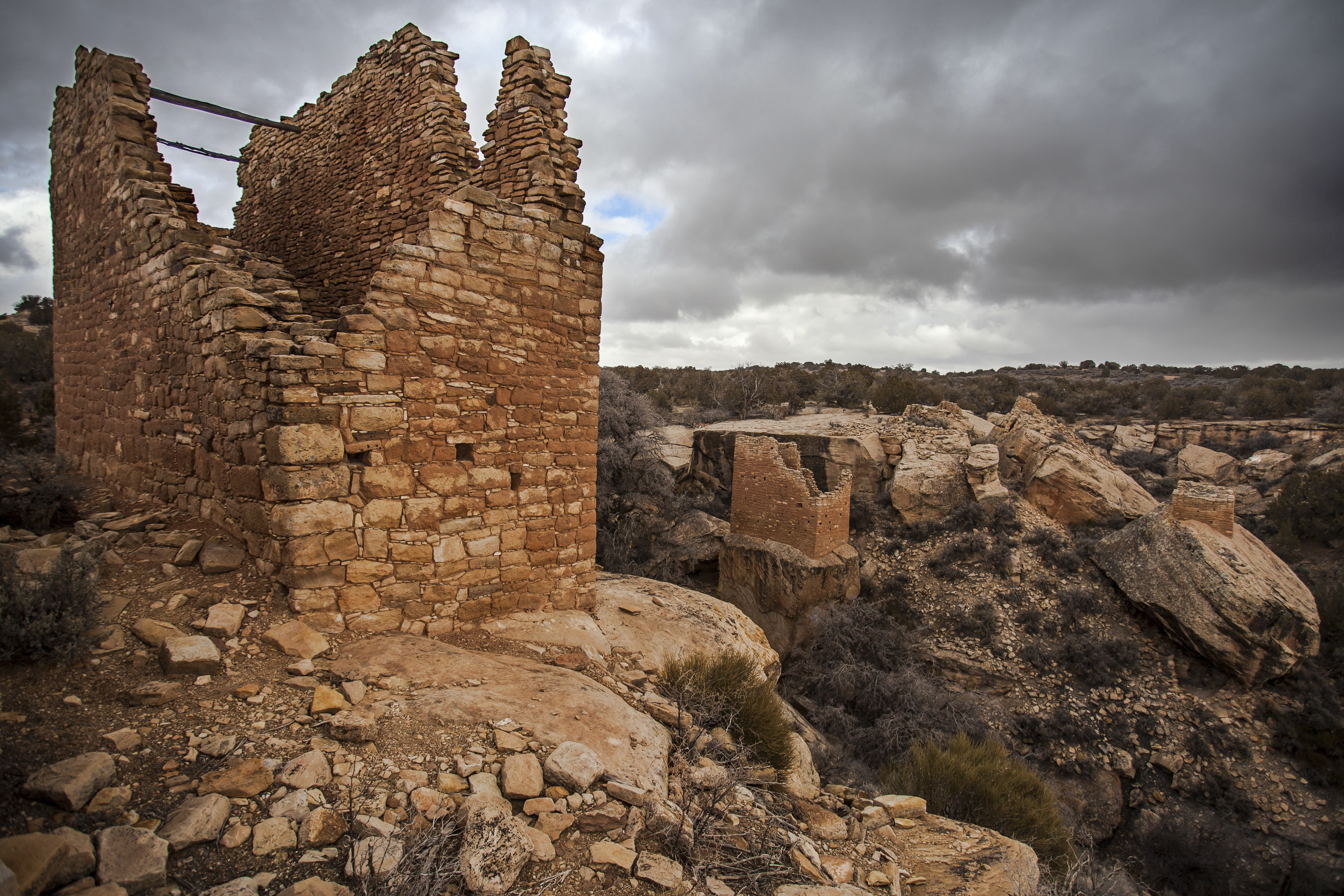
Holly Group

In 1854, William D. Huntington, on a missionary trip to the southwestern United States for Brigham Young, discovered the ruins of the present Hovenweep National Monument. The ruins were already known to the Ute and Navajo guides who considered them haunted and urged Huntington to stay away.

The name Hovenweep, which means "deserted valley" in the Ute language, was adopted by pioneer photographer William Henry Jackson and William Henry Holmes in 1878. The name is apt as a description of the area's desolate canyons and barren mesas as well as the ruins of ancient communities.

Concerned about the vandalism at the prehistoric ruins of the San Juan watershed in the Four Corner states, in 1903 T. Mitchell Pruden surveyed the ruins in those states and reported the following regarding the Hovenweep area:

Few of the mounds have escaped the hands of the destroyer. Cattlemen, ranchmen, rural picnickers, and professional collectors have turned the ground well over and have taken out much pottery, breaking more, and strewing the ground with many crumbling bones.

In 1917–18, ethnologist J. Walter Fewkes of the Smithsonian Institution included descriptions of the ruins in published archaeological survey reports, and recommended the structures be protected. Little archaeological excavation was done on sites until the 1970s.

== National monument ==
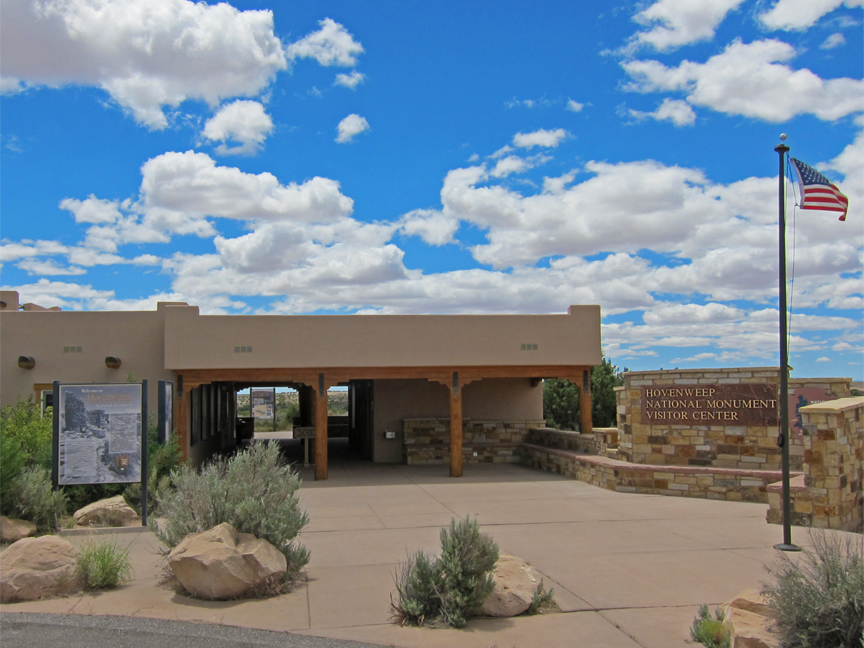
Visitor Center

President Warren G. Harding proclaimed Hovenweep a National Monument on March 2, 1923, which is administered by the National Park Service. On October 15, 1966 the National Monument was listed on the National Register of Historic Places.

In addition to the ruins, located in the Hovenweep National Monument are:

- Visitor Center at Square Tower Group
- 31 site campsite at Square Tower Group
- Hiking trails
- Parking, picnic and toilet facilities

== Climate ==
Hovenweep National Monument has a cold semi-arid climate (Köppen: BSk) with cold winters and hot summers.

Climate data for Hovenweep National Monument, Utah, 1991–2020 normals, extremes 1957–present
Month	Jan	Feb	Mar	Apr	May	Jun	Jul	Aug	Sep	Oct	Nov	Dec	Year
Record high °F (°C)	65 (18)	69 (21)	81 (27)	89 (32)	99 (37)	107 (42)	109 (43)	105 (41)	104 (40)	91 (33)	77 (25)	66 (19)	109 (43)
Mean maximum °F (°C)	54.2 (12.3)	62.2 (16.8)	73.3 (22.9)	81.6 (27.6)	90.6 (32.6)	99.7 (37.6)	102.3 (39.1)	98.9 (37.2)	94.0 (34.4)	83.5 (28.6)	68.5 (20.3)	55.5 (13.1)	102.7 (39.3)
Mean daily maximum °F (°C)	43.4 (6.3)	50.4 (10.2)	60.1 (15.6)	68.1 (20.1)	78.5 (25.8)	90.4 (32.4)	95.8 (35.4)	92.7 (33.7)	84.2 (29.0)	70.8 (21.6)	56.2 (13.4)	43.8 (6.6)	69.5 (20.8)
Daily mean °F (°C)	30.9 (−0.6)	37.0 (2.8)	44.5 (6.9)	51.6 (10.9)	61.4 (16.3)	71.8 (22.1)	78.4 (25.8)	76.0 (24.4)	67.1 (19.5)	53.9 (12.2)	41.1 (5.1)	30.9 (−0.6)	53.7 (12.1)
Mean daily minimum °F (°C)	18.3 (−7.6)	23.5 (−4.7)	28.9 (−1.7)	35.1 (1.7)	44.3 (6.8)	53.1 (11.7)	61.1 (16.2)	59.3 (15.2)	50.0 (10.0)	37.0 (2.8)	26.0 (−3.3)	18.0 (−7.8)	37.9 (3.3)
Mean minimum °F (°C)	4.7 (−15.2)	9.7 (−12.4)	16.1 (−8.8)	21.8 (−5.7)	30.2 (−1.0)	40.2 (4.6)	50.4 (10.2)	50.2 (10.1)	35.9 (2.2)	22.9 (−5.1)	12.4 (−10.9)	4.6 (−15.2)	0.9 (−17.3)
Record low °F (°C)	−21 (−29)	−15 (−26)	2 (−17)	12 (−11)	19 (−7)	26 (−3)	39 (4)	36 (2)	22 (−6)	8 (−13)	−1 (−18)	−24 (−31)	−24 (−31)
Average precipitation inches (mm)	0.95 (24)	0.96 (24)	0.79 (20)	0.64 (16)	0.79 (20)	0.32 (8.1)	0.96 (24)	1.00 (25)	1.13 (29)	1.05 (27)	0.74 (19)	0.87 (22)	10.20 (259)
Average snowfall inches (cm)	3.1 (7.9)	3.5 (8.9)	0.8 (2.0)	0.3 (0.76)	0.1 (0.25)	0.0 (0.0)	0.0 (0.0)	0.0 (0.0)	0.0 (0.0)	0.4 (1.0)	0.7 (1.8)	3.3 (8.4)	12.2 (31)
Average precipitation days (≥ 0.01 in)	4.9	5.3	5.0	4.4	4.9	2.0	6.0	6.1	5.5	5.1	3.4	5.0	57.6
Average snowy days (≥ 0.1 in)	2.0	2.1	0.7	0.4	0.1	0.0	0.0	0.0	0.0	0.1	0.4	2.5	8.3
Source: NOAA

== See also ==
- List of national monuments of the United States

Other neighboring Ancient Pueblo sites in Colorado

- Canyons of the Ancients Visitor Center and Museum
- Canyons of the Ancients National Monument
- Crow Canyon Archaeological Center
- Mesa Verde National Park

Other cultures in the Four Corners region

- Trail of the Ancients
- List of ancient dwellings of Pueblo peoples

Early American cultures

- List of prehistoric sites in Colorado
- Ancestral Puebloans
- Oasisamerica cultures
- Paleo-Indians
