= Dark Canyon Ruins =

Ruins in southeastern Utah

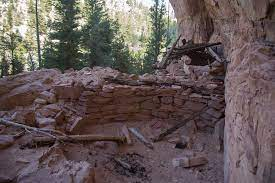
- Cliff ruins in Dark Canyon Wilderness

- Location within the United States Location within Utah
- Location: San Juan County, Utah, USA
- Nearest city: Blanding, Utah
- Coordinates: 37°46′35″N 109°53′51″W
- Governing body: U.S. Forest Service

The Dark Canyon Ruins are a collection of ancient Puebloan ruins in southeastern Utah found in Dark Canyon Wilderness, part of Bears Ears National Monument. At least 72 archaeological sites have been identified in the Beef Basin-Dark Canyon Plateau area. The ruins mostly consist of cliff dwellings, ceramics, and petroglyph art. Ceramic collections in the area indicate that the structures may have been occupied during the Pueblo II and Pueblo III periods. However, there is evidence of earlier human habitation in the canyons by the Pueblo/Anasazi, starting in 600 CE. Most of the ruins are cliff houses or storerooms, with the region abandoned around 1300 CE. Later, other native groups like the Ute and Navajo moved into the region, although they did not significantly contribute the structures.
