= Utah Division of Arts and Museums =

U.S. state government agency

The division's logo

The Utah Division of Arts & Museums is a state government agency responsible for the promotion of arts and museums in Utah. It is a division of the Utah Department of Cultural & Community Engagement. It includes the Utah Office of Museum Services and the Utah Arts Council as advisory and policy-making boards.

The Division's primary offices, as well as its arts education and literary arts programs, are located in the Glendinning Home, next to the Governor's Mansion in Salt Lake City. Its folk arts and museum services programs are housed in the Chase Home Museum of Utah Folk Arts. Its visual, public, and design arts programs operate from offices in the Rio Grande Depot in Salt Lake City. The Division maintains two public galleries: the Alice Gallery at the Glendinning Home, exhibiting artwork from Utah's State Fine Art Collection and Traveling Exhibition Program; and the Rio Gallery, at the Rio Grande Depot, exhibiting artwork of contemporary Utah artists.

Victoria Bourns has been the division's director since 2017.

== Utah Arts Council ==
The Utah Arts Council was established in 1899 as the Utah Art Institute through the passage of the "Art Bill," legislation drafted by Utah Rep. Alice Merrill Horne (an artist, arts patron, and the first woman elected to the Utah State House of Representatives) and fellow artist George M. Ottinger.

== See also ==
- State of Utah
