= Miracle of the gulls =

Mormon legend

The miracle of the gulls is an 1848 event often credited by members of the Church of Jesus Christ of Latter-day Saints for saving the second harvest of the Mormon pioneers in the Salt Lake Valley. While the event was not recorded contemporaneously, later accounts stated that seagulls miraculously saved the 1848 crops by eating thousands of insects that were devouring the settlers’ fields. The first crop was planted a few days after the pioneers entered the valley in 1847. Having been sown very late in the growing season, it produced a meager but usable harvest. Next spring, using seed from the first harvest, the settlers planted their second crop, which is when the “miraculous” event is said to have occurred.

== Traditional story ==
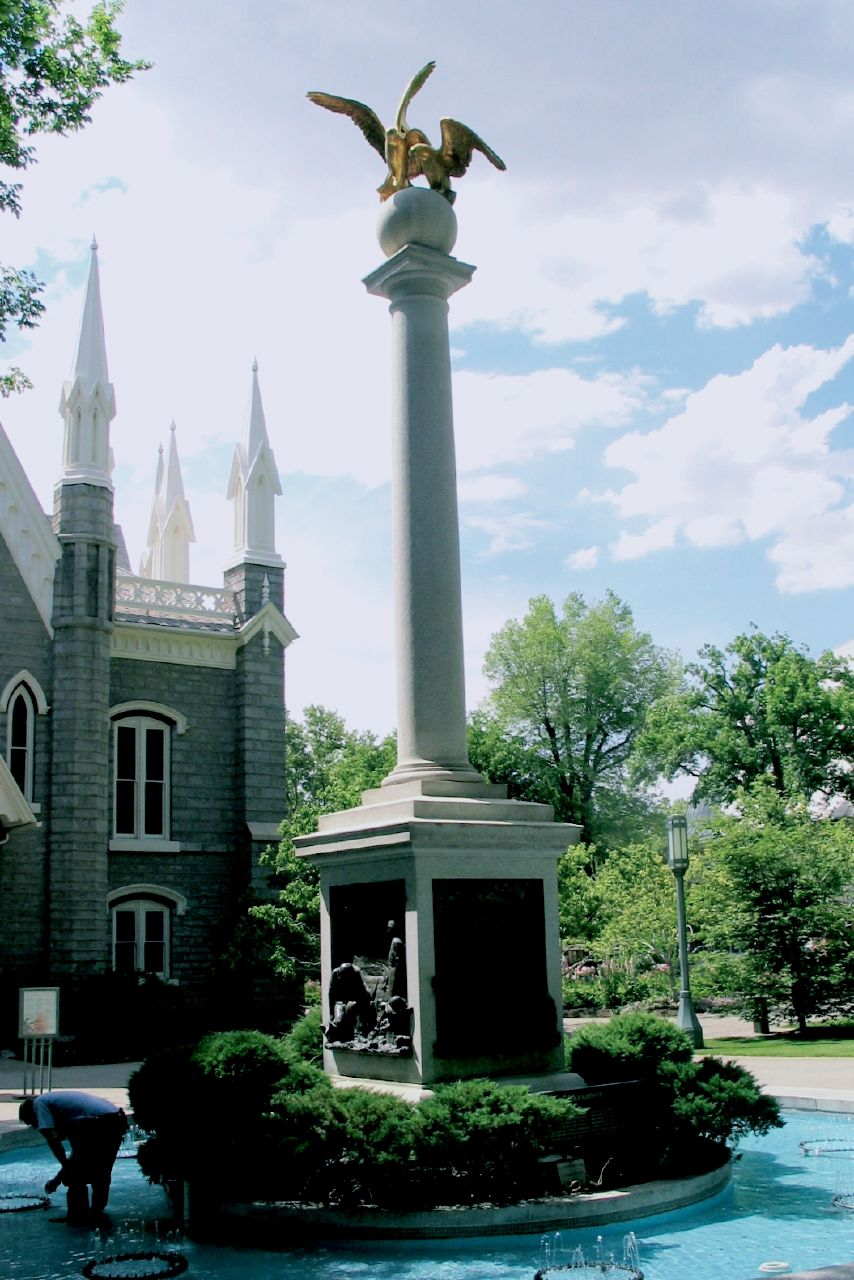
The Seagull Monument located in front of the Salt Lake Assembly Hall on Temple Square.

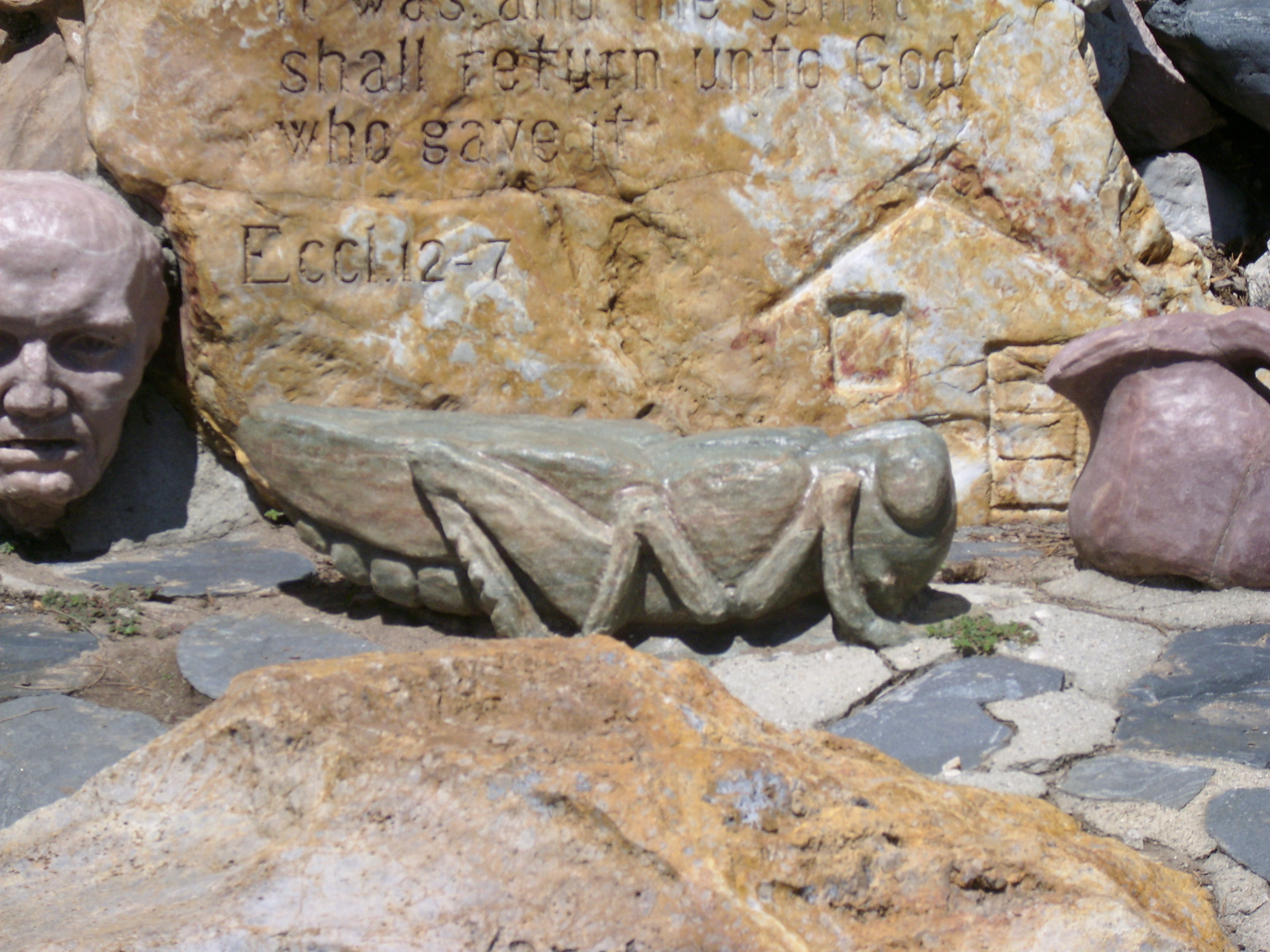
A stone grasshopper, commemorated at Gilgal Sculpture Garden.

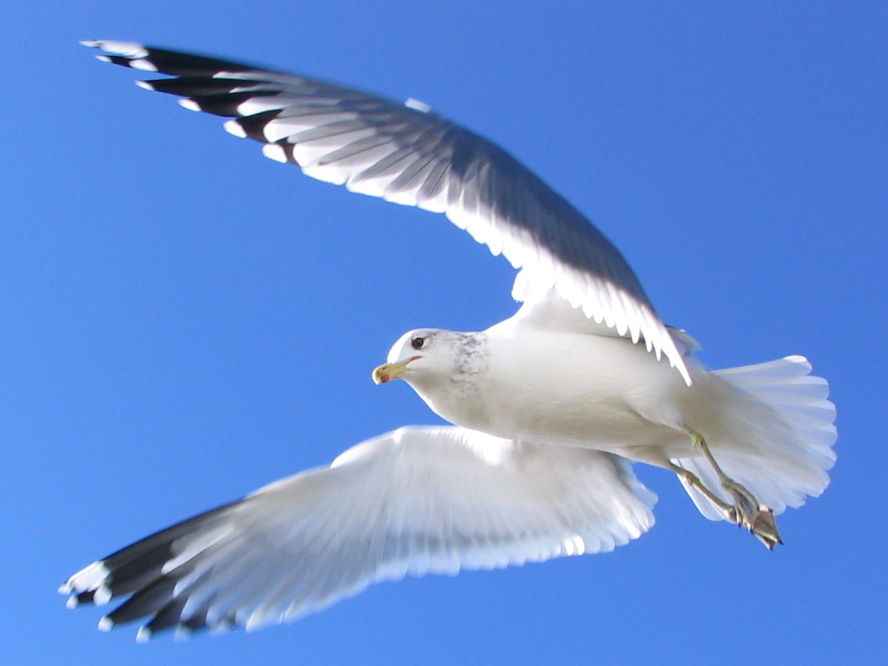
California gull (Larus californicus)

After Brigham Young led the first band of Latter-day Saints into what is now Salt Lake City, Utah, the pioneers had the good fortune of a relatively mild winter. Although late frosts in April and May destroyed some of the crops, the pioneers seemed to be well on their way to self-sufficiency. However, large swarms of insects appeared in the valley beginning in late May.

These insects, now called "Mormon crickets" because of this incident, are not true crickets, but instead belong to the katydid family. Having ornamental wings, they are unable to fly, but instead can travel in huge swarms. Mormon crickets eat all plant material in their path, but they also eat any insects that die on the way, including their own species. They are known to cyclically swarm in some areas of the Mountain West, especially in Utah, Nevada, and southern Idaho. These insects threatened the livelihood of the Mormon pioneers; stomping on the pests did not dissuade them from entering farms as others would advance. This is a reproductive strategy similar to mast reproduction in oaks, overwhelming predators with sheer numbers allowing a percentage of the population to survive to reproduce. Latter-day Saints often cast this disaster in Biblical terms like the 8th plague of locusts.

According to traditional accounts, legions of gulls appeared by June 9, 1848, following fervent prayers by the pioneer farmers. It is said that these birds, native to the Great Salt Lake, ate mass quantities of crickets, drank some water, regurgitated, and continued eating more crickets over a two-week period. The pioneers saw the gulls' arrival as a miracle, and the story was recounted from the pulpit by church leaders such as Orson Pratt and George A. Smith (Pratt 1880, p. 275; Smith 1869, p. 83). The traditional story is that the seagulls annihilated the insects, ensuring the survival of some 4,000 Mormon pioneers who had traveled to Utah. For this reason, the Seagull Monument was erected and the California gull is the state bird of Utah.

== Historical review ==
In 1970, William Hartley published an article about the 1848 cricket war. The following section is a summary of the opinions and research he put forward in that article.

- Seagulls did come and eat many of the crickets in 1848. Contemporary records describe the event as a blessing from God; Henry Bigler upon hearing of the event a few months after the fact in 1849 recorded that:
  [...] all looked upon the gulls as a God send, indeed, all acknowledged the hand of the Lord was in it, that He had sent the white gulls by scores of thousands to save their crops,
- The church's First Presidency, while mentioning the crop damage, frost, and crickets, made no mention of the gulls in their official summary of the first few years of the Mormons living in the Salt Lake Valley. Gulls regularly returned to feast on the crickets for years afterwards.
- Records predating the arrival of the Mormon pioneers show that various types of gulls, including the California gull, inhabited the Great Salt Lake area. These gulls fed on various insects, including crickets. Aerial feeding on swarming insects is particularly consistent with the behavior of Franklin's Gulls, whose summer breeding range includes the Salt Lake Valley.
- Gulls regurgitate the indigestible parts of insects, similar to how an owl regurgitates pellets. While this behavior seemed strange to the pioneers, it is normal for gulls.
- The crickets did major damage to the crops prior to the arrival of the gulls. Then after the arrival of the gulls, even after weeks of the gulls feasting on the crickets, the crickets were still a significant problem.
- The damage to the crops in 1848 was due to frost, crickets, and drought, and the gulls only had a minor impact on one of those factors.
- With that said, the gulls did have a real effect in alleviating the suffering of the 1848 Mormon pioneers, both physical and psychological:
  The fact remains, nonetheless, that the 1848 Mormon pioneers would have suffered more than they did, had not the gulls come to their aid. Physically, the gulls helped avert a complete agricultural disaster; the amount of crickets which thousands of gulls could consume in two or three weeks would be a staggering figure. And the birds did relieve hardpressed [sic] farmers from ardous [sic] toil against the crickets. More importantly perhaps, the gulls provided mental and emotional rejuvenation. Undoubtedly threats of leaving for California were diminished by the sudden appearance of the gull flocks...The 'Miracle of the Gulls' story remains appropriate as an expression of the faith held by Mormon pioneers and their descendants.
