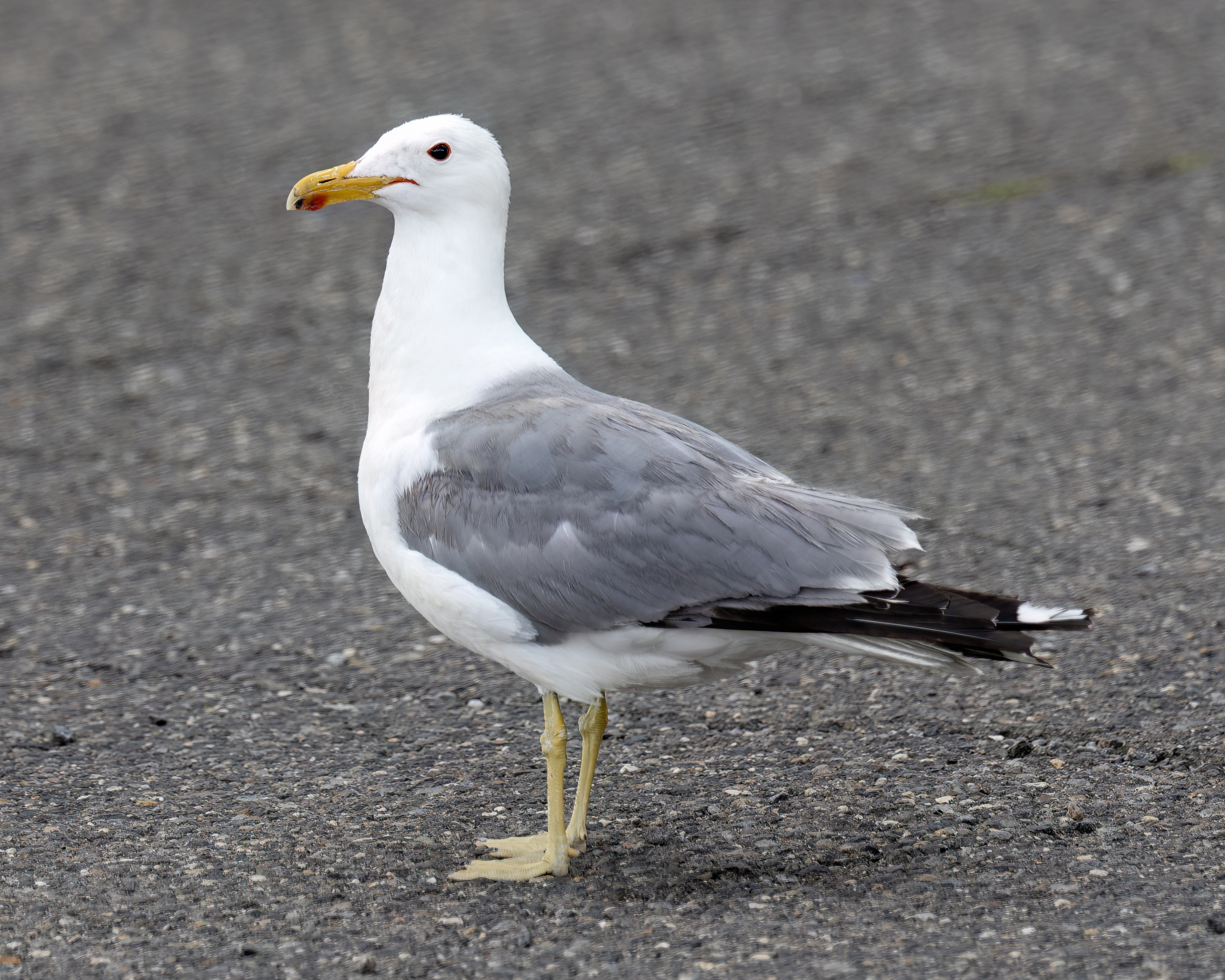
- Adult in breeding plumage

Conservation status
- Least Concern (IUCN 3.1)

Scientific classification
- Kingdom: Animalia
- Phylum: Chordata
- Class: Aves
- Order: Charadriiformes
- Family: Laridae
- Genus: Larus
- Species: L. californicus

Binomial name
- Larus californicus Lawrence, 1854

Subspecies
- L. c. californicus Lawrence, 1854 Great Basin California gull; L. c. albertaensis Jehl, 1987 Great Plains California gull
- Range of the California gull Breeding Migration Year-round Nonbreeding

= California gull =

Species of bird

The California gull (Larus californicus) is a medium-sized gull, smaller on average than the herring gull, but larger on average than the ring-billed gull (though it may overlap in size with both). Although named after California, it can be found annually across most of Western North America, from the Canadian prairie provinces in the northeast and south through western Mexico.

== Distribution and habitat ==
The breeding habitat of the California gull are lakes and marshes in interior western North America from the Northwest Territories, Canada south to eastern California and Colorado. They nest in colonies, sometimes with other birds. The nest is a shallow depression on the ground lined with vegetation and feathers. The female usually lays 2 or 3 eggs. Both parents take turns feeding their chicks.

California gulls are migratory, with most moving to the Pacific coast in winter, during which time they can regularly be found in western California.

== Subspecies ==
There are two subspecies recognized, the nominate from the Great Basin to central Montana and Wyoming, and the slightly larger, paler L. c. albertaensis with a more northerly distribution, ranging from Great Slave Lake onto the Great Plains of western Manitoba and South Dakota. Although these subspecies are not well distinguishable by mtDNA allozyme variation, they breed true and the low genetic divergence can be explained by separation during the Pleistocene and renewed contact in Montana during more recent times.

== Description ==
Adults are similar in appearance to the herring gull, but with brown eyes, yellow legs, and a more rounded head. The body is mainly white with grey back and upper wings. The bill is yellow with a black ring and red spot near the tip. They have black primaries with white tips. Immature birds are also similar in appearance to immature herring gulls, with browner plumage than immature ring-billed gulls. Length can range from 46 to 55 cm (18 to 22 in), the wingspan 122–137 cm (48–54 in) and body mass can vary from 430 to 1,045 g (0.948 to 2.304 lb).

== Behavior ==
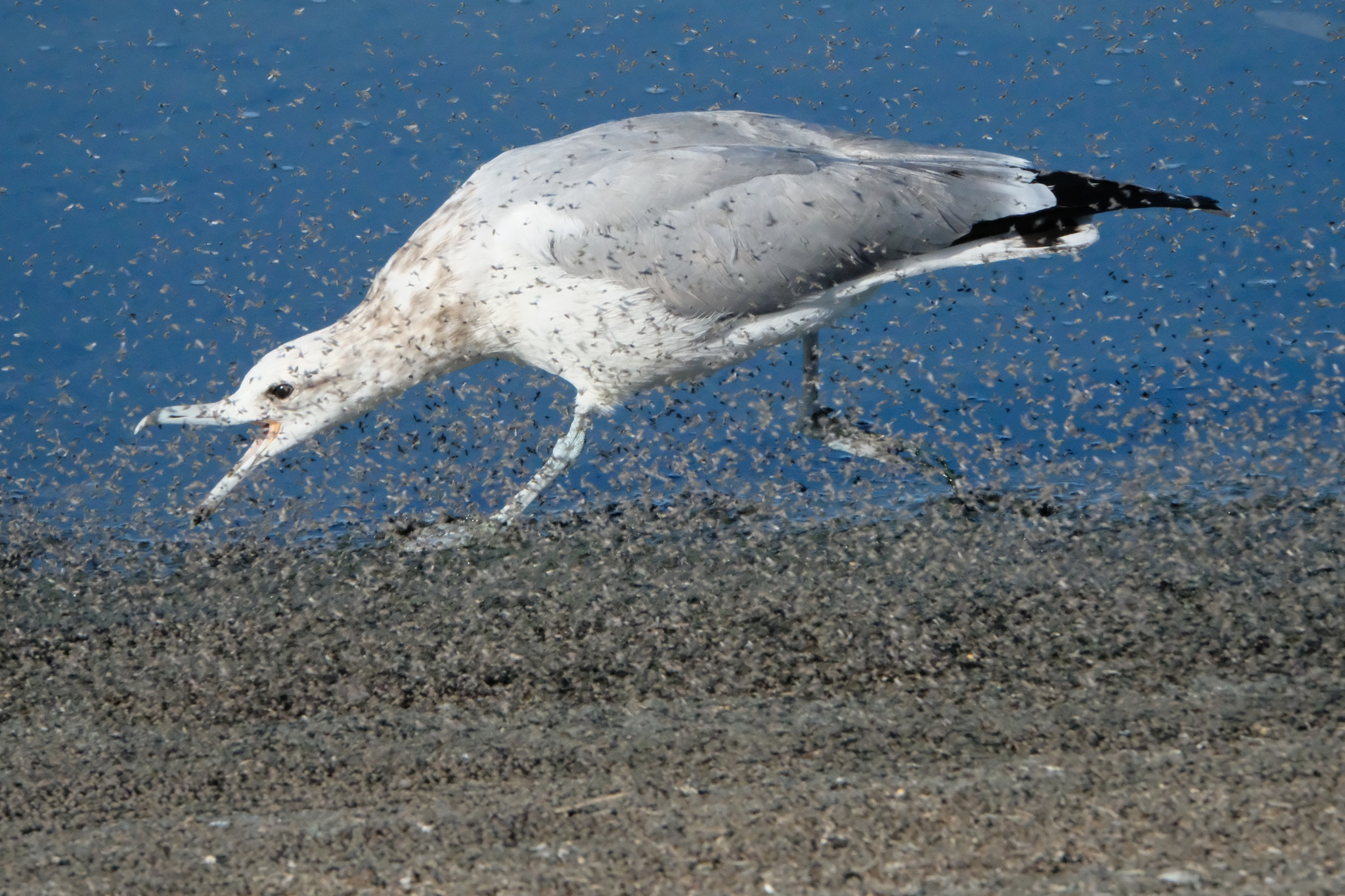
Feeding on brine flies, in San Diego

These birds forage in flight or pick up objects while swimming, walking or wading. They mainly eat insects, fish and the eggs and young of other birds, especially ducklings. Opportunistic feeders, California gulls often can be seen scavenging at garbage dumps, marinas and docks. They may follow fishing boats and plows in fields for insects stirred up by this activity. They frequently beg for food at public beaches, parks and other locations where people will hand feed them. They have been known to steal food from people at picnics and outdoor restaurants.

California gulls are also known to eat various vegetables and fruits, particularly cherries. As a result, in some areas it may be regarded as a crop pest.

== State bird ==
The California gull is the state bird of Utah, remembered for assisting Mormon settlers in dealing with a plague of Mormon crickets. A monument in Salt Lake City commemorates this event, known as the "Miracle of the Gulls".

== Status in California ==
In California, the California gull at one time held the protected status California Species of Special Concern due to declining numbers at their historic California breeding colony at Mono Lake. However, in recent decades this species has begun to breed in the southern portion of San Francisco Bay, where it did not historically breed, and has undergone exponential population growth. These California gulls now inhabit large, remote salt-production ponds and levees and have a very large food source provided by nearby landfills from San Francisco, San Jose and other urban areas, all the way up into the Sacramento area. The South Bay California gull population has grown from less than 1,000 breeding birds in 1982 to over 33,000 in 2006. This population boom has resulted in large resident flocks of gulls that will opportunistically prey on other species, particularly the eggs and nestlings of other birds. Seriously threatened birds that share the same South Bay habitat include the snowy plover and California least tern, while less-threatened birds, including black-necked stilts, American avocets, Forster's terns, and Caspian terns, are also preyed upon by the abnormally large flocks of California gulls. Efforts are underway to reduce habitat for this species and find other ways to disperse the large numbers of gulls.

== Gallery ==
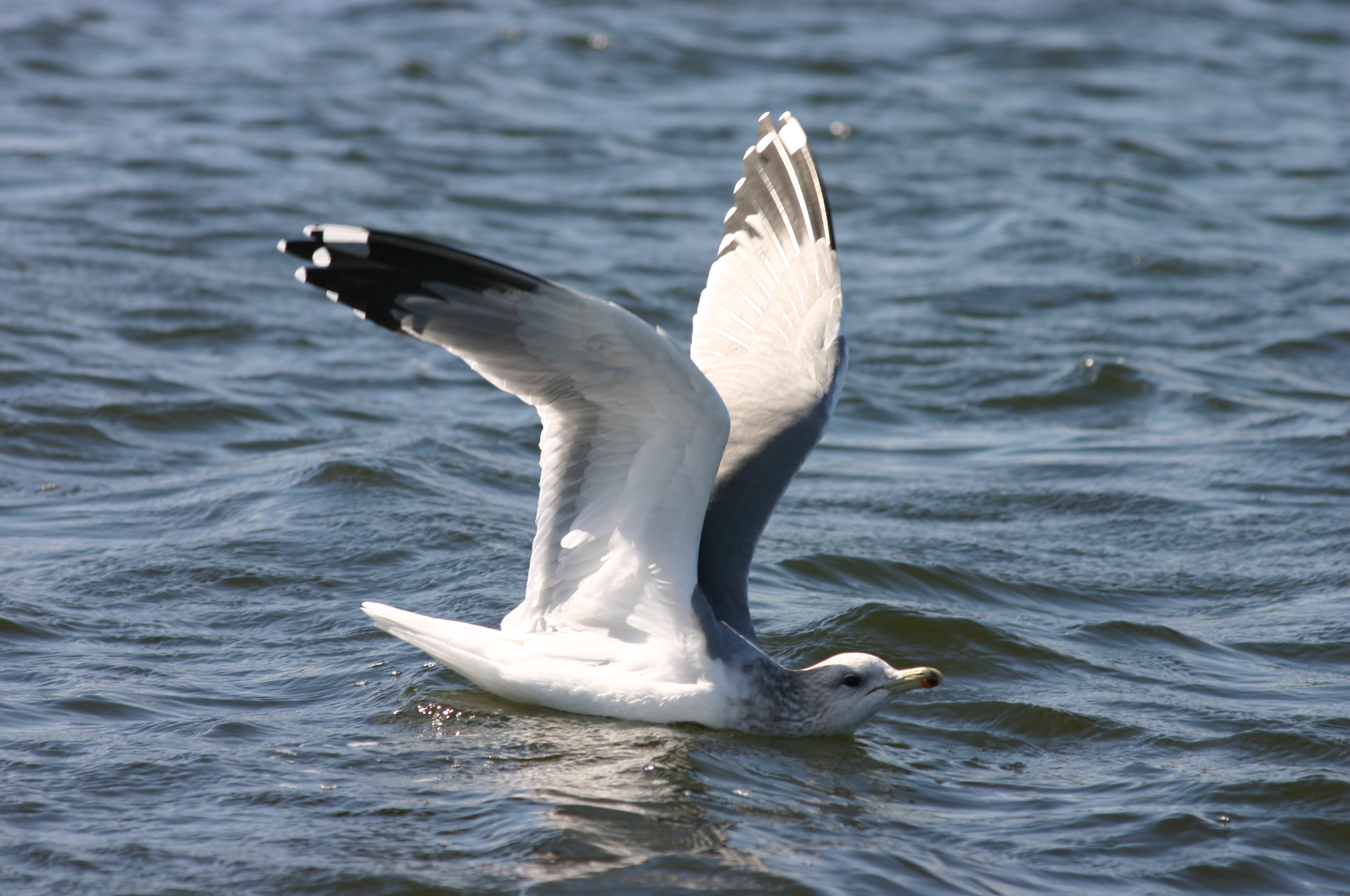
Winter plumage, California

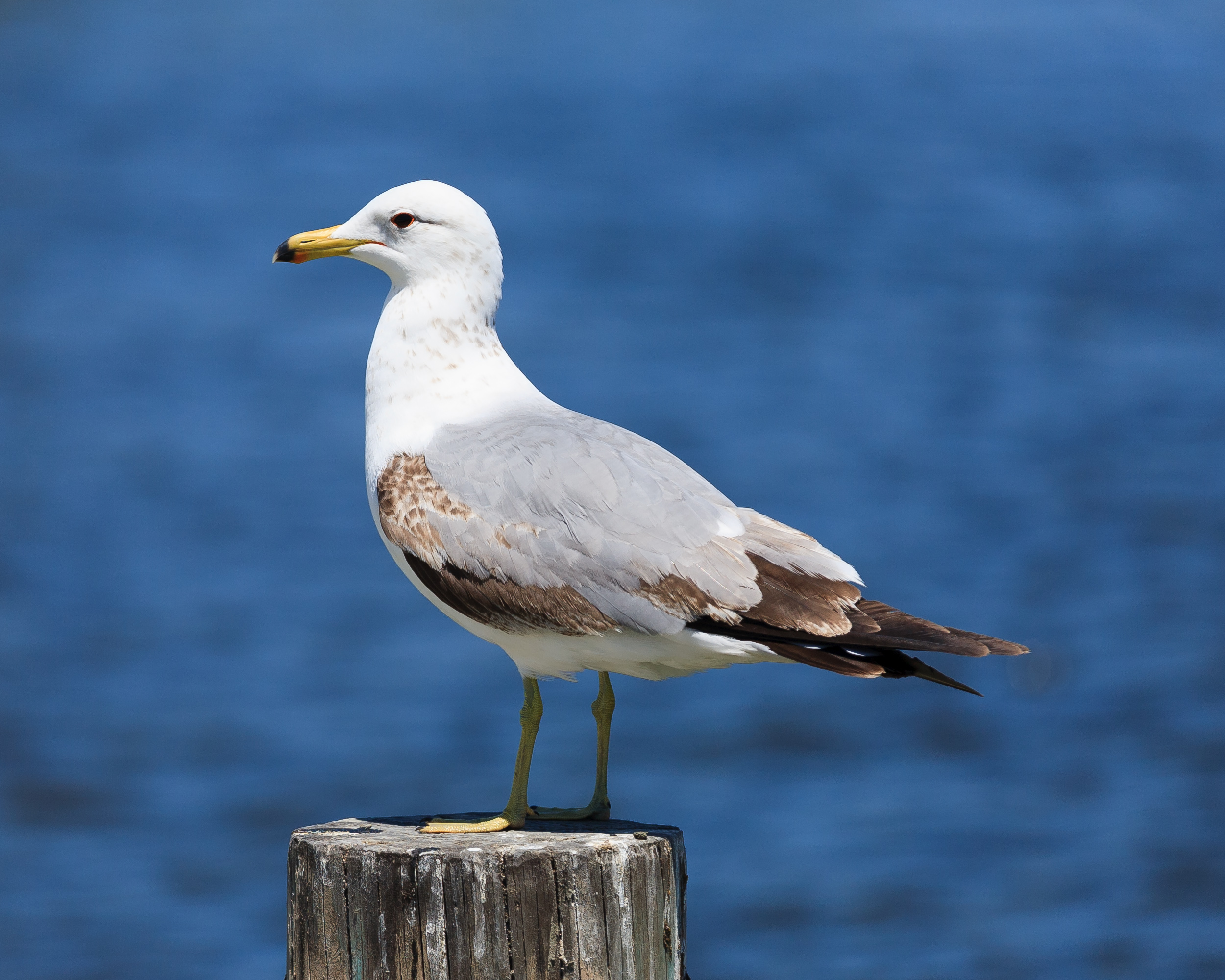
Second summer plumage

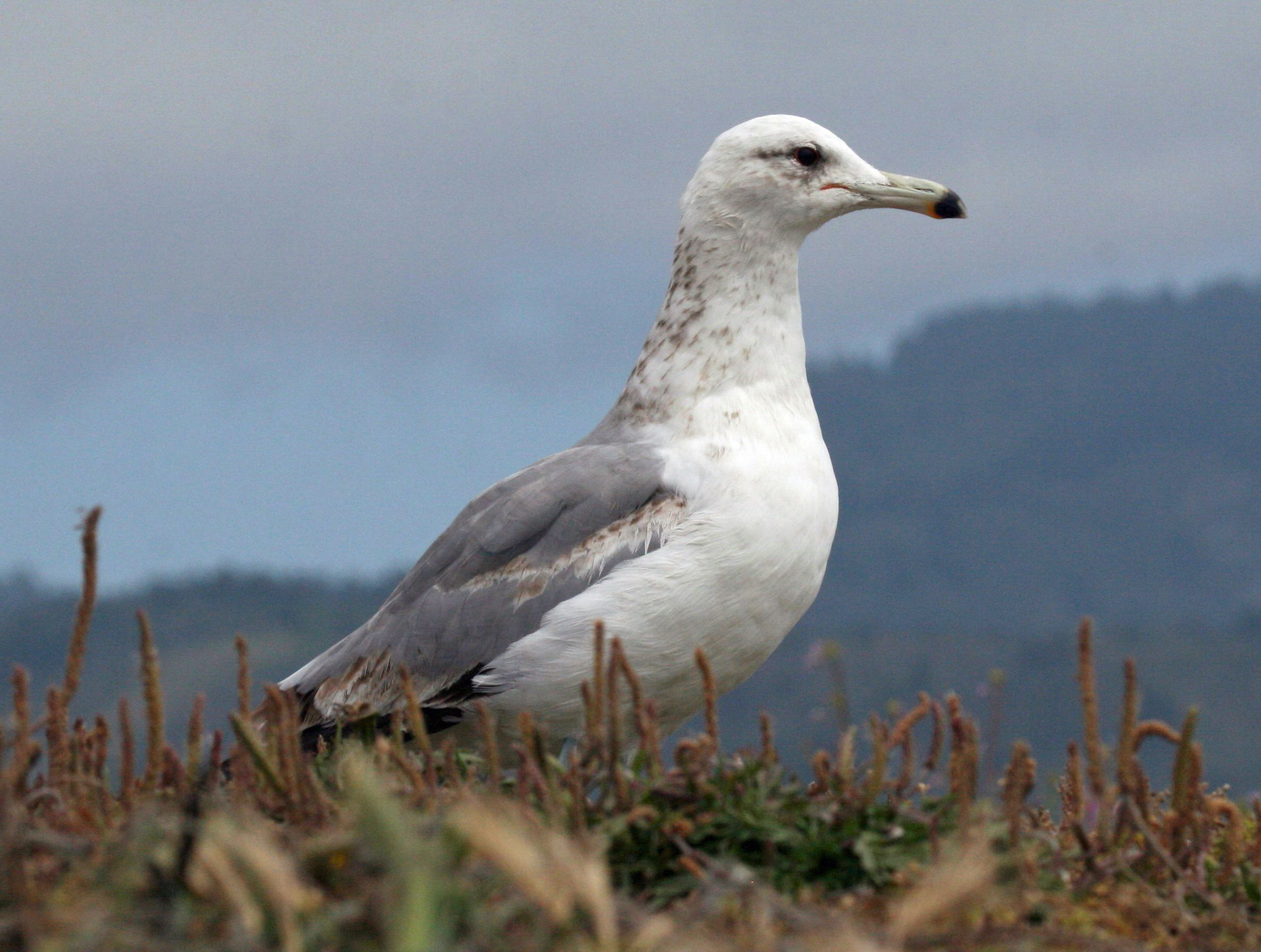
In California

immature, British Columbia

adult, non-breeding plumage, British Columbia

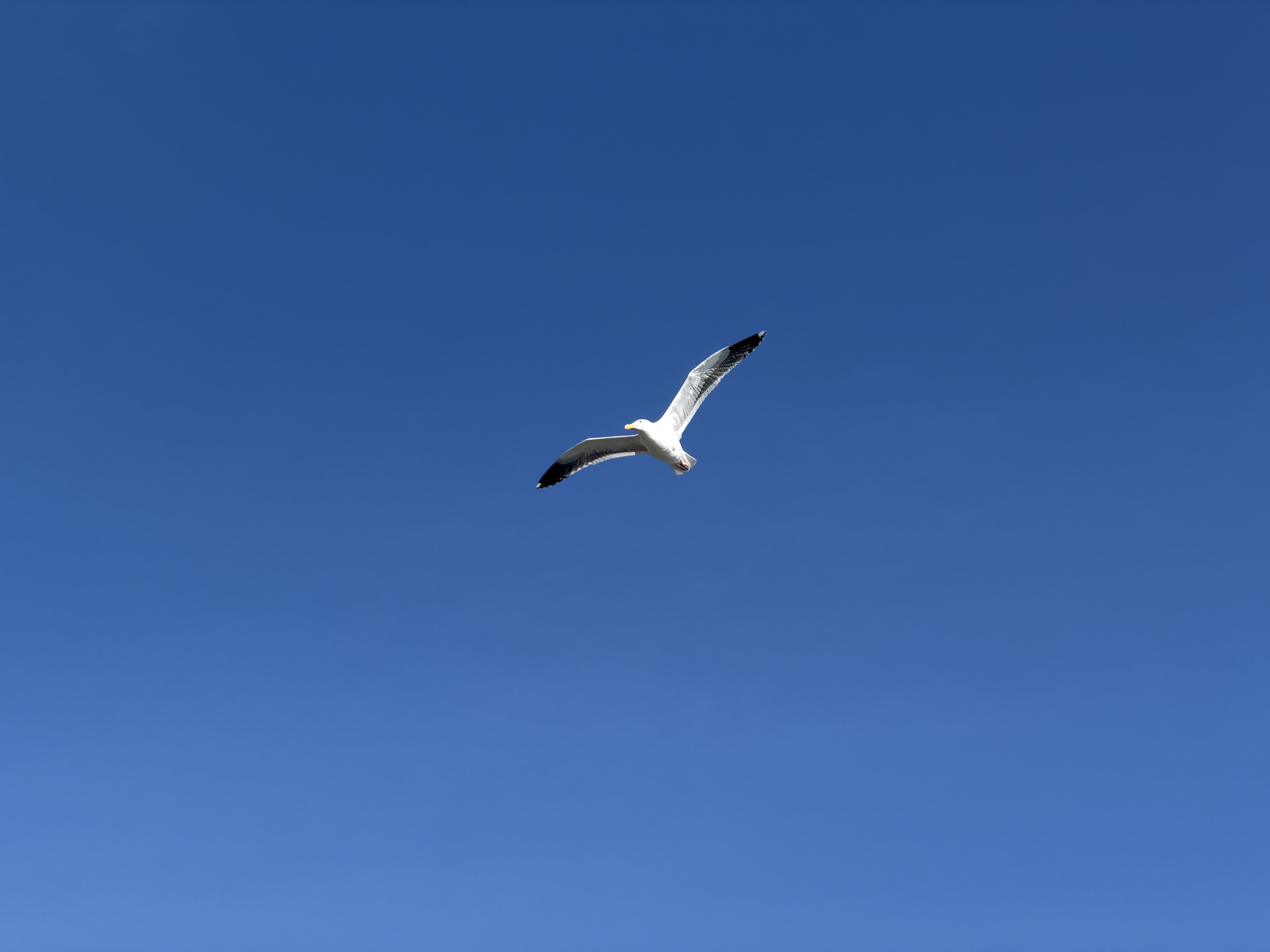
California gull flying near Pismo beach
