= Eldred G. Smith =

American Leader in The Church of Jesus Christ of Latter-day Saints (1907–2013)

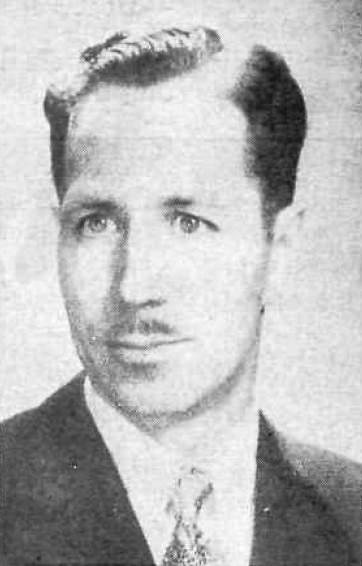
- Smith in 1957 (age 50)

Patriarch Emeritus / Emeritus General Authority
- October 6, 1979 – April 4, 2013
- Called by: Spencer W. Kimball

Patriarch to the Church
- April 10, 1947 – October 6, 1979
- Called by: George Albert Smith
- End reason: Granted general authority emeritus status

Personal details
- Born: Eldred Gee Smith; January 9, 1907; Lehi, Utah, United States
- Died: April 4, 2013 (aged 106); Salt Lake City, Utah, United States
- Resting place: Salt Lake City Cemetery; 40.7772°N 111.858°W
- Alma mater: University of Utah
- Spouse(s): Jeanne Ness (until her death); Hortense Child (1977–2012)
- Children: 5

Eldred Gee Smith (January 9, 1907 – April 4, 2013) was the patriarch to the church of the Church of Jesus Christ of Latter-day Saints (LDS Church) from 1947 to 1979. From 1979 to his death he was the patriarch emeritus of the church. He was the oldest and longest-serving general authority in the history of the church, although he had not been active in that capacity from 1979 to his death.

== Early life and education ==
Smith's father was Hyrum G. Smith, the presiding patriarch of the LDS Church from 1912 to 1932. The younger Smith graduated from LDS High School in Salt Lake City and later the University of Utah. He was trained and worked as an engineer, registered several patents, and enjoyed building and repairing clocks. From 1926 to 1929, he served as a LDS Church missionary in the Swiss-German Mission. Smith later served in several church positions, including high councilor and bishop of the 20th North Ward in Salt Lake City. From 1943 to 1946, Smith lived in Oak Ridge, Tennessee, while working on the Manhattan Project and served as president of the church's branch in Oak Ridge.

== LDS Church service ==
At the time of Smith's birth, a new presiding patriarch was usually chosen based on the principle of patrilineal succession. The 25-year-old was unmarried and without a college degree when his father died in 1932, however. Believing that he was not ready, church president Heber J. Grant left the position vacant, and later appointed Eldred Smith's cousin, Joseph Fielding Smith, to be presiding patriarch in 1942. Joseph Fielding Smith's request to be released was granted by church president George Albert Smith in 1946.

Eldred Smith was selected as the next presiding patriarch in 1947, marking the return of the office to the line of eldest sons descending from Hyrum Smith. By then he had married, started a family, and worked at several professions including cleaning and painting the ceiling of the Salt Lake Tabernacle. Smith later said of his first days as patriarch: "There is no way to prepare for it, no instructions, no counsel. When I was first ordained, I went into my office, closed the door and didn’t come out for two weeks. Then a young man came to the door asking for a blessing and so I gave it to him." During his tenure as presiding patriarch, Smith's primary duty was to travel to areas of the world where there were no patriarchs in order to bestow patriarchal blessings upon worthy Latter-day Saints. For example, he gave 139 blessings in 16 days in Australia in 1966.

Smith regularly spoke in the church's general conferences, but was only rarely assigned to visit local stakes of the church.

In 1979, Smith was released from active duties and designated patriarch emeritus. The published reason for the change as noted in the church's Ensign magazine: "Because of the large increase in the number of stake patriarchs and the availability of patriarchal service throughout the world, we now designate Elder Eldred G. Smith as a Patriarch Emeritus, which means that he is honorably relieved of all duties and responsibilities pertaining to the office of Patriarch to the Church." As evident in the video archive of the conference and as noted in other sources, the exact wording in the conference itself was that Smith was "honorably relieved—not released—of all duties and responsibilities..." After his release Smith often spoke at firesides, where he displayed artifacts from Joseph and Hyrum Smith's lives.

Smith was considered an emeritus general authority of the church after he was relieved of his duties. He remained an ordained patriarch and was still permitted to give patriarchal blessings. Throughout his life, he gave almost 20,000 patriarchal blessings. However, he was no longer sustained by the church as a "prophet, seer, and revelator" as he was from 1947 to 1979. He was sustained simply as "patriarch emeritus" in the October 1979 and April 1980 general conferences, and mentioned only with several other men as "emeritus General Authorities" during the sustaining in the October 1980 conference. Following the October 1980 sustainings (the transcript of which notes "a call of 'no' from several in the congregation" in opposition to the sustaining of Spencer W. Kimball as church president), the practice of sustaining the church's highest officers at every conference was temporarily abandoned, replaced instead with specific mention of only those offices that had changed since the last conference. This pattern was largely followed until the April 1985 conference, at which the sustainings returned to the previous form of presenting the president of the church, First Presidency, and Quorum of the Twelve Apostles for sustaining whether or not a change in membership had occurred. At this point, Smith was not mentioned specifically, but included with "All other members of the First Quorum of the Seventy and the emeritus Brethren as at present constituted." His death was announced during the Priesthood session April 2013 general conference, which took place just days later, and was mentioned in the church's May 2013 Ensign and Liahona magazines.

On January 9, 2007, Smith celebrated his 100th birthday. He was the second general authority in the history of the church to reach the age of 100, the first being Joseph Anderson, who died in 1992 at the age of 102.

The LDS Church has not stated directly whether it will appoint a new presiding patriarch, but after Smith's death an official magazine of the church, Liahona, described him as "the last person to hold the position." Similarly, an official Church News article published shortly after Smith's death described him as the "Final Church Patriarch," as well as "the seventh and final Patriarch to the Church" (phrasing which is also notable since Smith was generally considered the eighth man to officially hold the office). He was survived by, among others, his eldest son, Eldred Gary Smith, who would possibly have inherited the patriarchal office had it not been discontinued, and who co-wrote a scholarly history of the office of presiding patriarch.

== Personal ==
Smith was born in Lehi, Utah. He and his wife, Jeanne Ness, were the parents of five children. After his wife's death, Smith married the widow Hortense Hogan Child in 1977.

Smith died at his home in Salt Lake City, Utah, at 106. He was the oldest and longest-serving general authority in church history, although not active as such for many years, and the oldest living man in Utah prior to his death.

== See also ==
- Patriarchal Priesthood

== Notes ==
The Church of Jesus Christ of Latter-day Saints titles
New title	Patriarch Emeritus; October 6, 1979–April 4, 2013	Position abolished
Preceded by Joseph Fielding Smith	Presiding Patriarch; April 10, 1947–October 6, 1979	Position abolished
