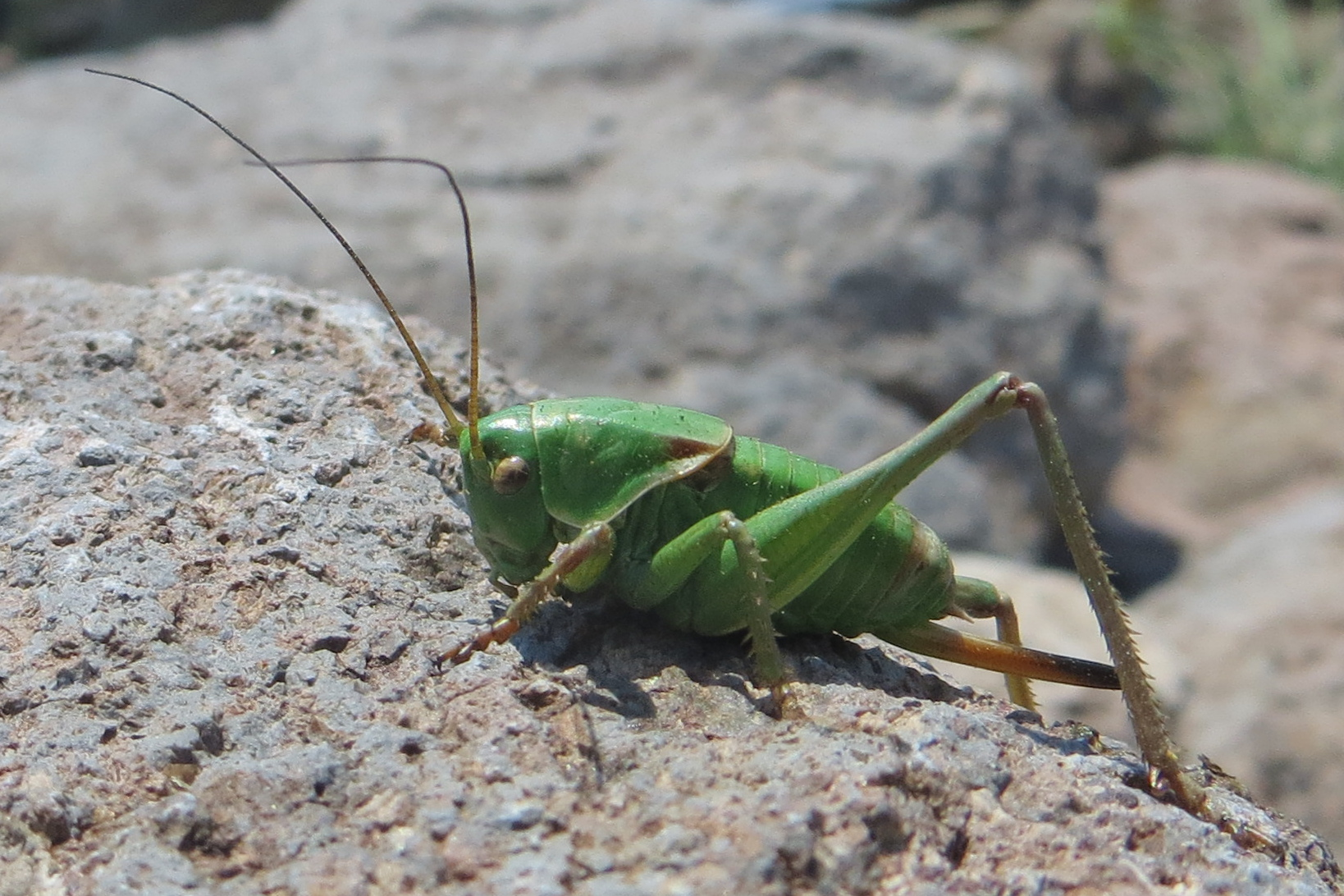
- Anabrus simplex (Mormon cricket)

Scientific classification
- Domain: Eukaryota
- Kingdom: Animalia
- Phylum: Arthropoda
- Class: Insecta
- Order: Orthoptera
- Suborder: Ensifera
- Family: Tettigoniidae
- Subfamily: Tettigoniinae
- Tribe: Platycleidini
- Genus: Anabrus; Haldeman, 1852

= Anabrus =

Genus of cricket-like animals

Anabrus is a genus of insects in the family Tettigoniidae that includes the Mormon cricket.

The Orthoptera Species File, lists the following species:

- †Anabrus caudelli Cockerell, 1908
- Anabrus cerciata Caudell, 1907
- Anabrus longipes Caudell, 1907
- Anabrus simplex Haldeman, 1852
