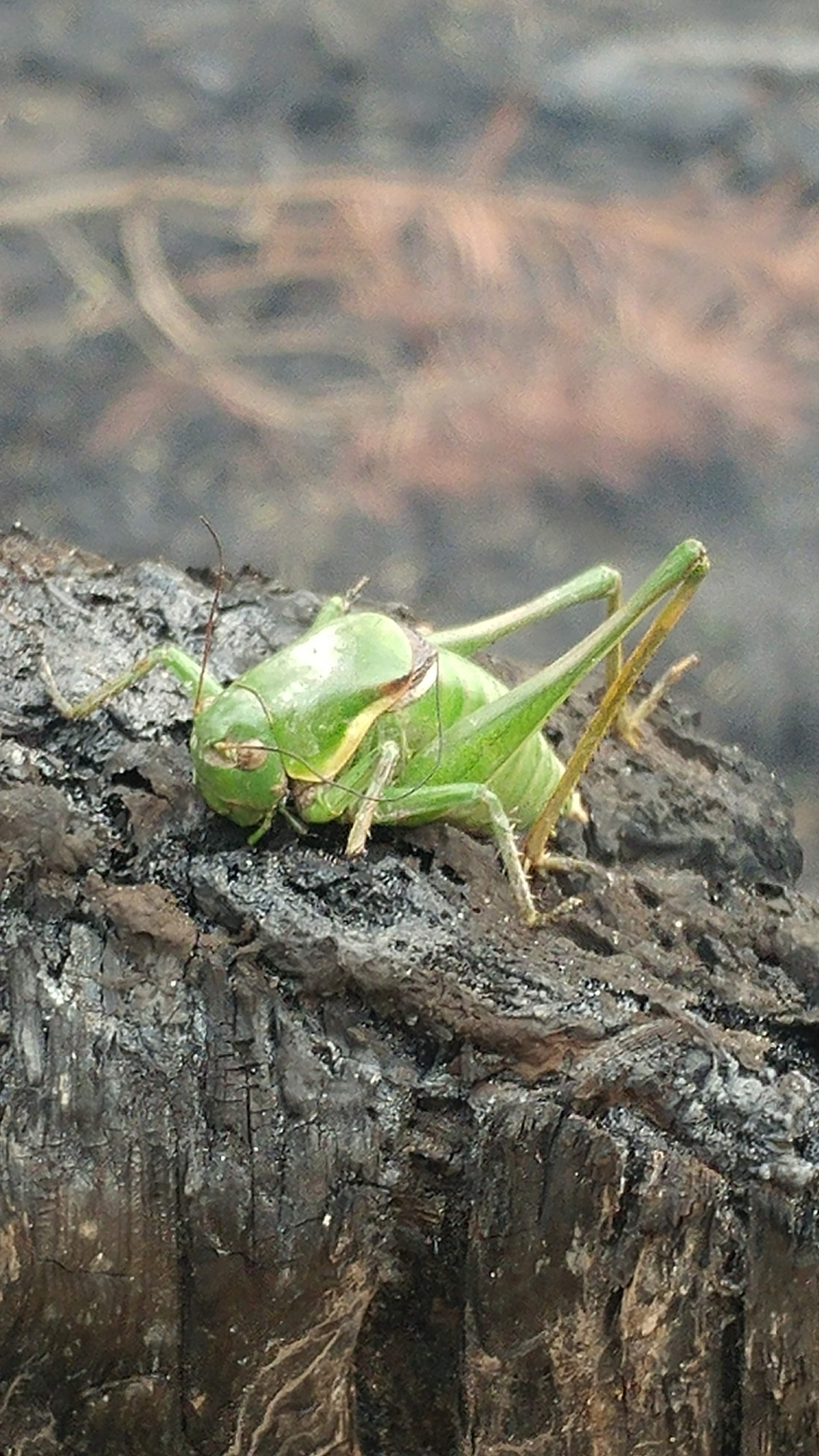

Scientific classification
- Domain: Eukaryota
- Kingdom: Animalia
- Phylum: Arthropoda
- Class: Insecta
- Order: Orthoptera
- Suborder: Ensifera
- Family: Tettigoniidae
- Subfamily: Tettigoniinae
- Tribe: Platycleidini
- Genus: Anabrus
- Species: A. longipes

Binomial name
- Anabrus longipes Caudell, 1907

= Anabrus longipes =

Species of cricket-like animal

Anabrus longipes, the long-legged anabrus, is a species of shield-backed katydid in the family Tettigoniidae. It is found in North America.
