= Allen Park (Salt Lake City) =

Public park and bird sanctuary in Salt Lake City, Utah

- Hobbitville
- Location within Utah
- Interactive map of Allen Park
- Location: 1328 Allen Park Dr, Salt Lake City, Utah, United States
- Coordinates: 40.7300629°N 111.8534557°W
- Area: 8 acres (3.2 ha)
- Created: 1931
- Operator: Salt Lake City Parks and Public Lands
- Status: Open year-round
- Website: www.slc.gov/parks/allenpark/

Allen Park, colloquially known as Hobbitville, is an 8-acre (3.2 ha) public park and former bird sanctuary in Salt Lake City, Utah. Established in 1931 by Dr. George A. Allen, the property is famous for its unique folk art, eclectic architecture, and a long-standing urban legend that it was a private colony for "little people." After decades as a secluded residential community, it was purchased by Salt Lake City in 2020 to be preserved as a public park.

== History ==
Allen Park was developed by Dr. George A. Allen, a veterinarian and founding medical director of Hogle Zoo, and his wife, Ruth Larsen Allen. Beginning in 1931, the Allens moved approximately 15 historic log cabins and small dwellings to the site to create a low-rent community for students, artists, and patients. Dr. Allen, who also co-founded the Tracy Aviary, kept the grounds as a sanctuary for exotic birds, including peacocks and pheasants. The park is noted for its "anti-urban" design, featuring stone light posts and concrete mosaics embedded with philosophical aphorisms.

== The "Hobbitville" Legend ==
The name "Hobbitville" stems from a decades-old urban legend claiming the park was a "midget colony" or a hidden village for people of short stature. Local folklore suggested that the inhabitants lived in miniature houses built at a 2/3 scale and were hostile toward outsiders. This narrative was reinforced by the secluded nature of the property and its unique architectural features.

Physical characteristics of the property played a significant role in fueling these myths. Many of the small cabins were pioneer-era structures with low doors and ceilings that appeared diminutive to outside observers. Furthermore, the park's dense tree canopy and narrow, unpaved road contributed to a sense of isolation. In reality, the residents were typical tenants, and their perceived hostility was generally a defensive response to the high volume of late-night trespassers and vandals. There is no historical evidence that the park was ever intended for or inhabited by people of short stature.

== Preservation ==
Following the death of Ruth Allen in 2018, the property fell into disrepair. In 2020, to prevent the land from being cleared for housing development, Salt Lake City purchased Allen Park for $7.5 million. The city now operates it as a public park, focusing on stabilizing the art installations and preserving the riparian habitat of Emigration Creek.

== See also ==
- Gilgal Sculpture Garden
- List of urban legends
