= Hortense Child Smith =

Hortense Hogan Child Smith (May 6, 1919 – May 17, 2012) was the First Counselor to Ruth H. Funk in the General Presidency of the Young Women organization of the Church of Jesus Christ of Latter-day Saints (LDS Church) from 1972 to 1978.

Hortense Hogan was born in Thatcher, Idaho. She attended Utah State University and earned a degree from LDS Business College. In 1939, she married Robert Rumel Child, the only son of Thomas B. Child. As such she was connected with Child's creation of Gilgal Sculpture Garden. She was the head of the Friends of Gilgal Garden that worked to preserve the unique art project from destruction by a housing development. Through her efforts the garden was purchased by the Friends of Gilgal organization and turned over to the care of Salt Lake City for preservation. Hortense and Robert had two children.

After Robert Child died, Hortense married Eldred G. Smith in 1977.

Smith died on May 17, 2012, shortly after her 93rd birthday.
