= Gilgal Sculpture Garden =

Park in Salt Lake City, Utah, U.S.

Coordinates: 40.75927°N 111.8692°W

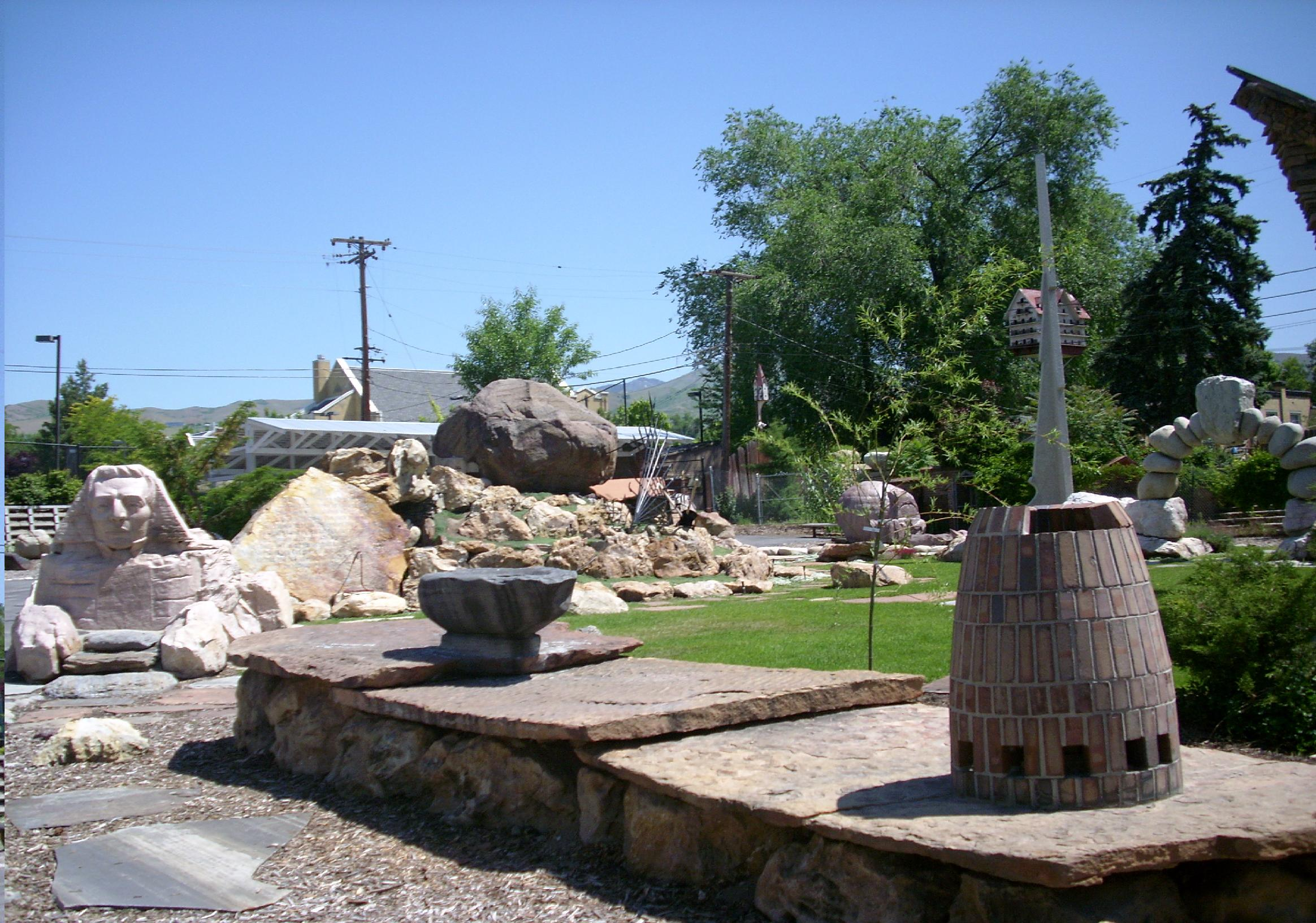
- Some sculptures, including the Sphinx with Joseph Smith's head
- Interactive map of Gilgal Sculpture Garden
- Type: Public park
- Location: Salt Lake City, Utah, U.S.
- Open: 1947

The Gilgal Sculpture Garden is a small public city park, located at 749 East 500 South in Salt Lake City, Utah, United States. The park, which is filled with unusual symbolic statuary associated with Mormonism—most notably a Sphinx with Joseph Smith's head—was designed and created by LDS businessman Thomas Battersby Child, Jr. (1888-1963) in his spare time. The park contains 12 original sculptures and over 70 stones engraved with scriptures, poems and literary texts. Gilgal Sculpture Garden is the only designated "visionary art environment" in the state of Utah.

== History ==
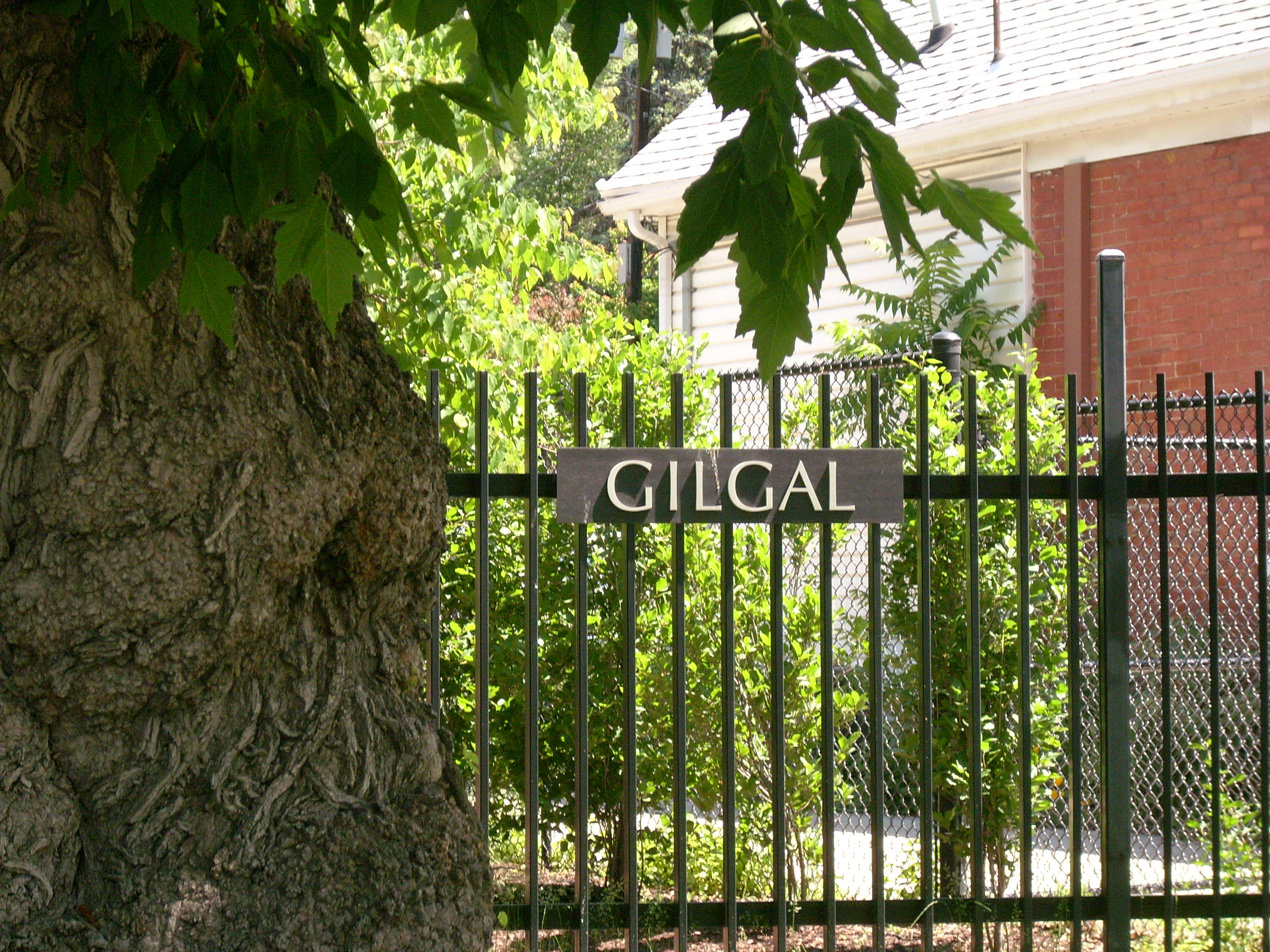
Gate at the entrance to the garden.

Thomas Child, a masonry contractor and Bishop of the 10th Salt Lake LDS ward, conceived of a symbolic sculpture garden that would be a retreat from the world and a tribute to his most cherished religious and personal beliefs. He began building the garden in the backyard, when he was 57 years old, and continued to pour his time and money into the work until his death in 1963. Child named the garden Gilgal after the Biblical location where Joshua ordered the Israelites to place twelve stones as a memorial. The name "Gilgal" is sometimes translated to mean "circle of standing stones," an appropriate appellation for a sculpture garden. Gilgal is also the name of a city and a valley in The Book of Mormon, a sacred scripture in The Church of Jesus Christ of Latter-day Saints.

Many of the sculptures and quotations found at Gilgal refer to LDS themes: the restoration of the Priesthood, the great Mormon migration west, and the many similarities Child saw between the ancient Israelites and his LDS forefathers.

Although Child was not a classically trained artist, he went to great lengths to obtain and shape the perfect stones for his beloved garden. He created a complete workshop in his yard for handling and cutting the stones, proudly stating that all the finish work for his statues was completed on the site. He also used some unconventional tools to cut the stones, including an oxyacetylene torch (usually used for welding). Besides help from his son-in-law Bryant Higgs, Child hired Maurice Edmunds Brooks to help with the Gilgal project.

The finished statues are likewise unconventional, even eccentric: a sacrificial altar, a shrine to Child's beloved wife Bertha, even a sphinx with the face of Joseph Smith. Child, who shared the garden with thousands of visitors over his lifetime, knew that not everyone would appreciate his particular artistic vision. His primary concern, however, was that the garden would succeed in making people think: "You don't have to agree with me," he said. "You may think I am a nut, but I hope I have aroused your thinking and curiosity."

== Restoration ==
Until 2000, the garden was owned by the Henry P. Fetzer family. Fetzer was a neighbor who bought the property after Child's death in 1963. Only open on Sundays, the garden was visited and often vandalized by late night trespassers. The family, tired of keeping up the garden, considered making it the centerpiece of an apartment development. Later a plan was floated by a Canadian company to tear down the garden and put in condominiums.

Instead, a group of citizens called the Friends of Gilgal Garden, headed by Hortense Child Smith, the widow of Child's son, purchased an option to buy the property provided they could raise funds by January 10, 2000. The group arranged a $400,000 commitment from Salt Lake County and $100,000 each from the Church of Jesus Christ of Latter-day Saints and the George S. and Dolores Dore Eccles Foundation, covering the lion's share of the purchase price. However these commitments were conditioned on the garden becoming a city park, which Salt Lake City Council was reluctant to take because of a budget crunch. The property was eventually purchased for $679,000 and turned over to the city. On October 21, 2000, Gilgal Garden reopened as a city park. At a ceremony celebrating the occasion, Salt Lake City mayor Rocky Anderson called the garden "an absolute jewel."

After many years of neglect and damage by vandals, the garden has been restored greatly. The Friends of Gilgal Garden, who serve as the park's curators, and a number of other nonprofit entities in the Salt Lake City area are in the process of raising funds to restore the damaged sculptures.

From 2001 to 2005 Utah Master Gardeners reduced the overgrowth of weeds on the property and made the grounds themselves pleasing. By 2005 restoration work had also begun on some of the sculptures.

== Visiting hours ==
Gilgal Garden is open to visitors during the following hours:

- April–September — 8 am to 8 pm daily
- October–March — 9 am to 5 pm, weather permitting

The garden is closed on Christmas, New Year's Day, and Thanksgiving Day.

Garden Entrance - South

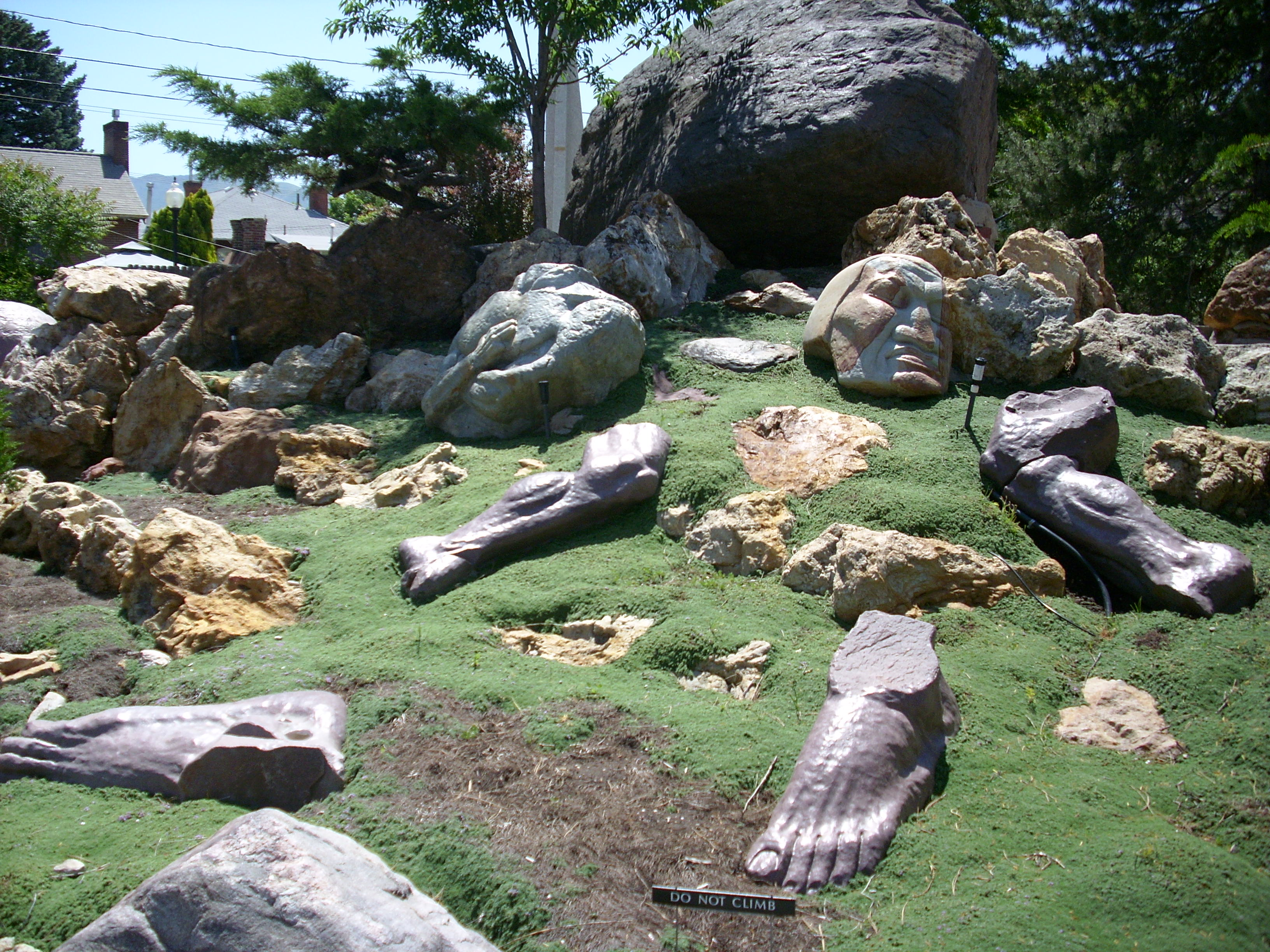
A statue interpretation of King Nebuchadnezzar's dream in the Book of Daniel.

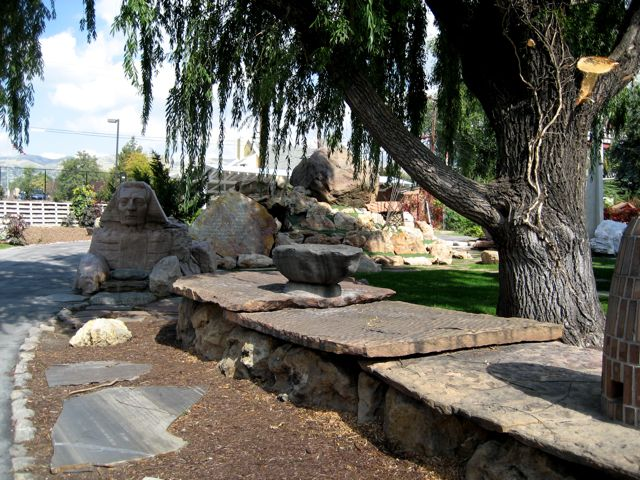
Another picture of the Sphinx

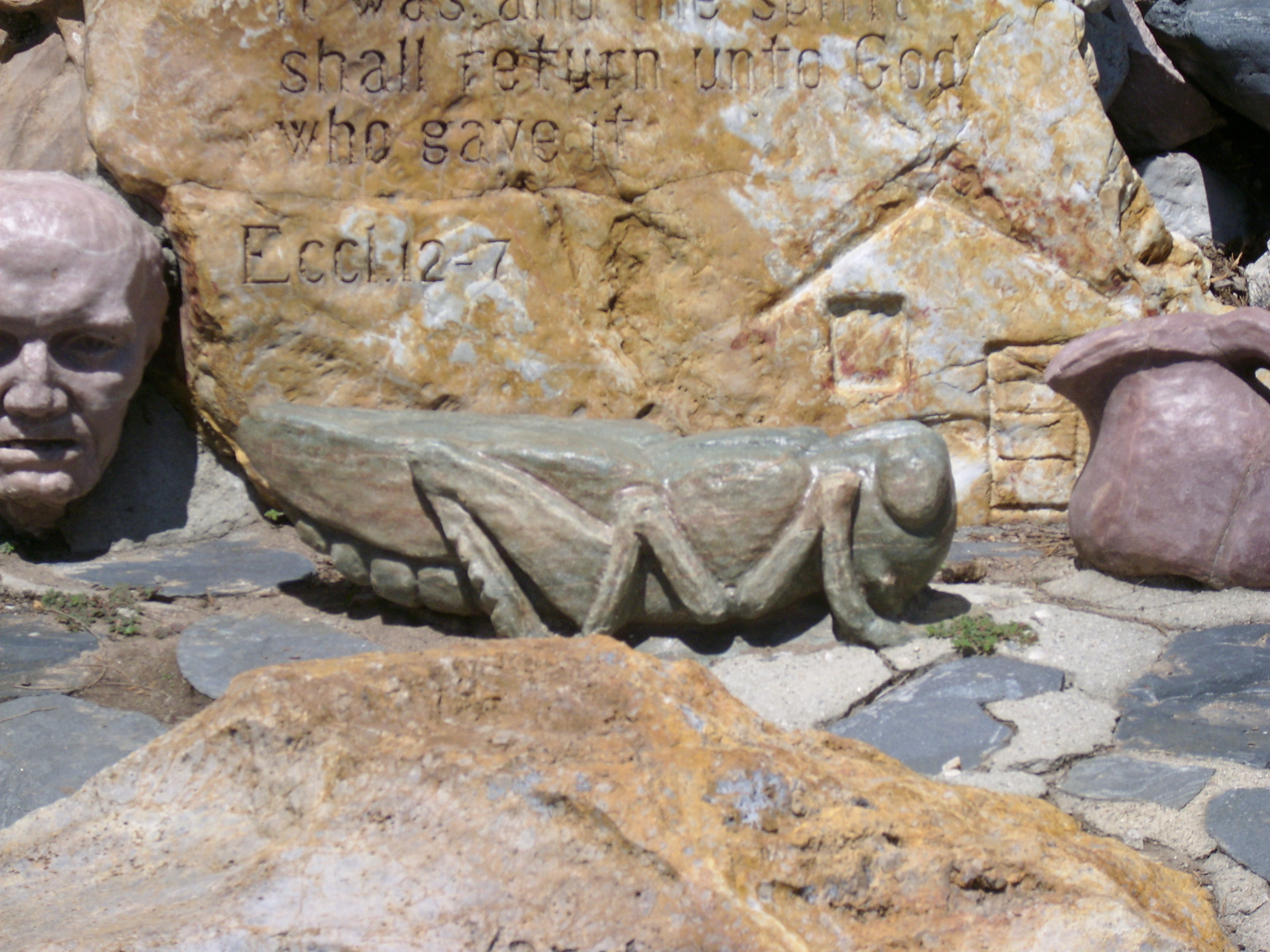
from the last chapter of the Book of Ecclesiastes in the Bible. It includes objects from the verse "... the almond tree shall flourish, and the grasshopper shall be a burden... the silver cord be loosed, or the golden bow be broken, or the pitcher be broken at the fountain, or the wheel broken at the eistern"

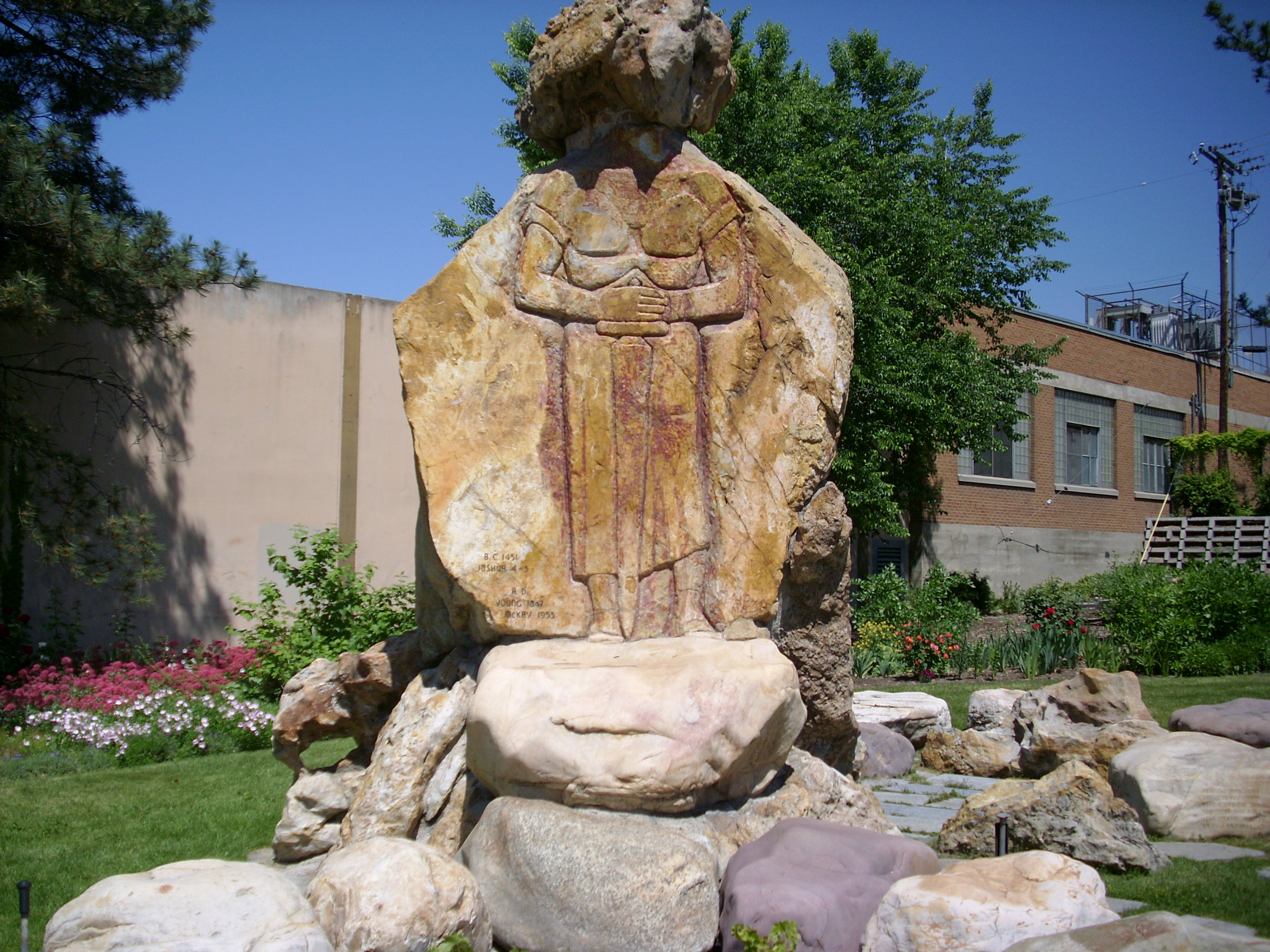
Captain of the Lord's Host

== See also ==
- Allen Park (Salt Lake City)
