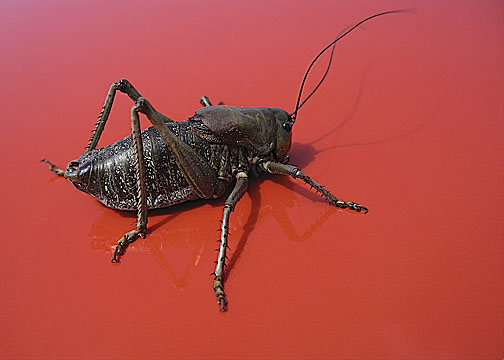

Conservation status
- Secure (NatureServe)

Scientific classification
- Kingdom: Animalia
- Phylum: Arthropoda
- Clade: Pancrustacea
- Class: Insecta
- Order: Orthoptera
- Suborder: Ensifera
- Family: Tettigoniidae
- Genus: Anabrus
- Species: A. simplex

Binomial name
- Anabrus simplex Haldeman, 1852

= Mormon cricket =

Species of cricket-like animal

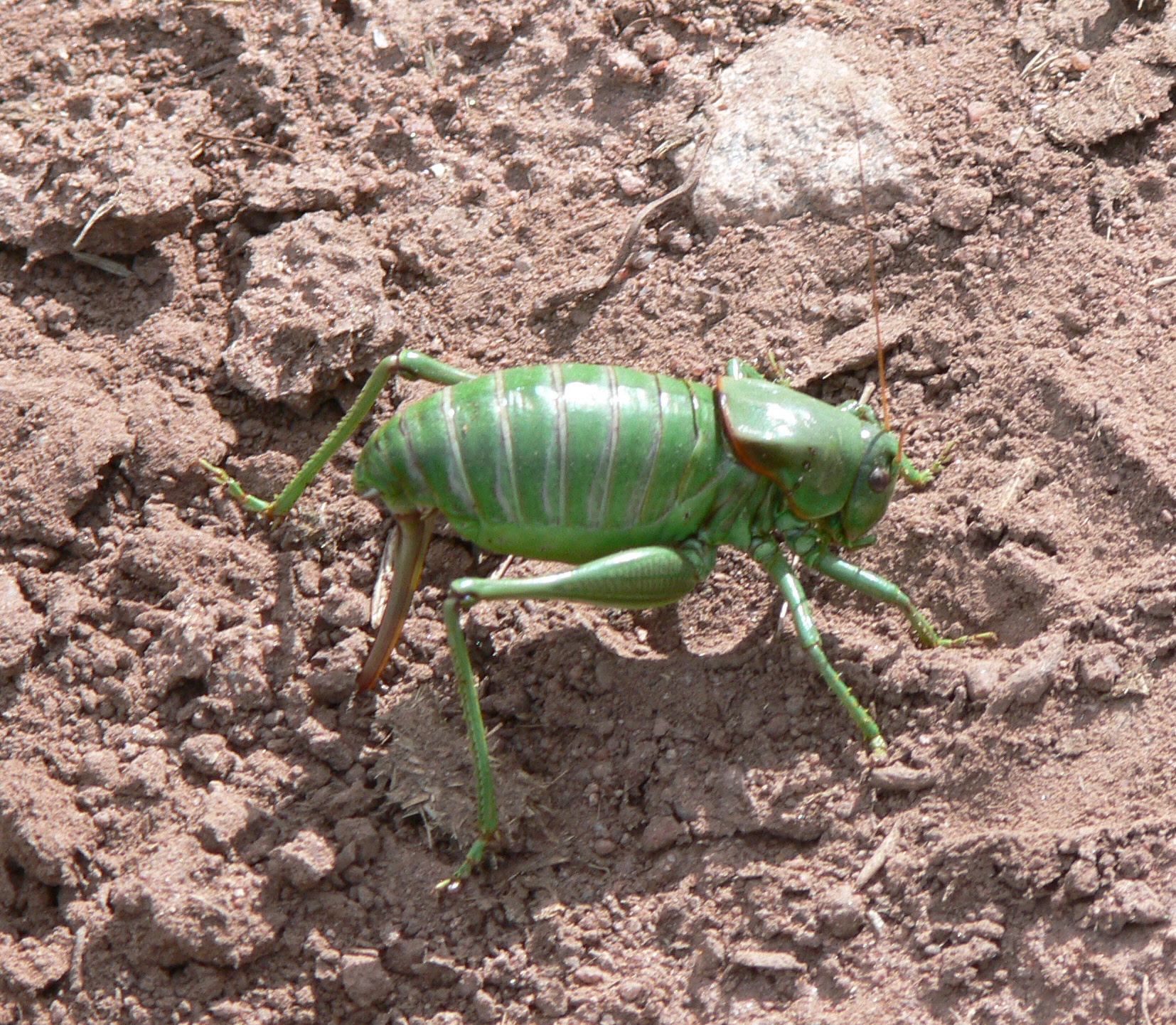
Anabrus simplex green form of female, ovipositing in soil

The Mormon cricket (Anabrus simplex) is a large insect native to western North America in rangelands dominated by sagebrush and forbs. Anabrus is a genus in the shield-backed katydid subfamily in the Tettigoniidae family, commonly called katydids, bush crickets, and previously "long-horned grasshoppers". Its common name, "Mormon cricket", is a misnomer: true crickets are of the family Gryllidae.

The Mormon cricket takes its common name from the prominent role it played in the story of the miracle of the gulls after the Mormon settlers in Utah had encountered them while pushing westward.

Although flightless, the Mormon cricket may travel up to two kilometres a day in its swarming phase during which it may be a serious agricultural pest and sometimes a traffic hazard.

== Description ==
Mormon crickets can grow to almost 8 cm (3 inches) in length. Individuals vary in coloration: the overall color may be black, brown, red, purple or green. The pronotum, the dorsal "shield" above the prothorax, covers vestigial wings); in some specimens it bears colored markings. The abdomen may have a striped appearance. Like many Tettigoniidae, females have a long ovipositor, which should not be mistaken for a stinger.

As is characteristic of Tettigoniidae, the antennae are long and filamentous. They are in general longer than the head plus body, though the ovipositor extends to beyond the ends of the antennae.

As also is the case in swarming locusts, high population densities of swarming Mormon crickets cause them to undergo changes in morphology and coloration: solitaria, individuals in the solitary phase, typically have green or purple coloration, while swarming individuals, gregaria, are often black, brown or red.

== Life cycle ==
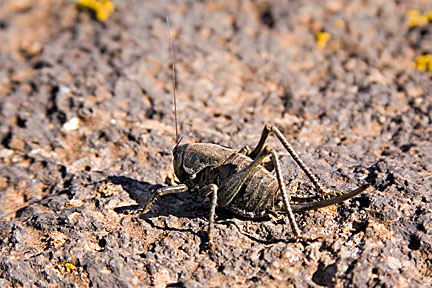
Utah, October 2005

Mormon cricket eggs hatch mostly in the spring after they are laid, although in some areas eggs may take as many as five years to hatch. Hatching begins when soil temperatures reach 4 °C (40 °F). The nymphs pass through seven instars before reaching the adult stage, typically taking 60 to 90 days.

Breeding begins within 10 to 14 days of reaching the adult stage. The male passes to the female a large spermatophore which can be up to 27% of his body weight. The spermatophore is mostly food for the female to consume but also contains sperm to fertilize her eggs. This nuptial gift causes swarming-phase females to compete for males, a behavior not seen in solitary-phase females.

The female lays her eggs by thrusting her long ovipositor deep into the soil. Each female can lay over one hundred eggs, with individual eggs having the appearance of a grain of rice with a gray to purplish color.

== Swarming ==
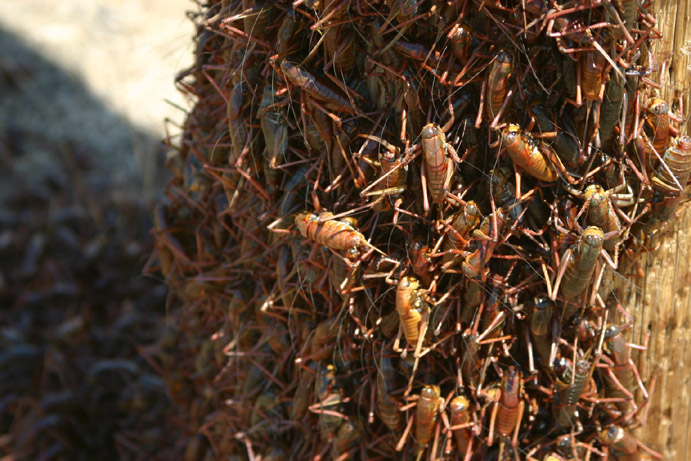
Nevada, summer 2006

The Mormon cricket exists in populations of relatively low density throughout most of its range. At certain times and places, population explosions or infestations occur in which large numbers of the crickets form roving bands. These bands may include millions of individuals and be found with densities of up to 100 individuals per square meter. These infestations may last years or even decades, and are characterized by a gradual increase and then decrease in population. The factors that trigger these infestations are poorly understood, but are thought to be weather-related.

Research published in 2006 shows that Mormon crickets move in these migratory bands, firstly to find new sources of the critical nutrients of protein and salt, and secondly to avoid being eaten by hungry crickets approaching from the rear. The Mormon cricket's cannibalistic behavior may lead to swarm behavior because crickets may need to move constantly forward to avoid attacks from behind.

When a large band crosses a road, it can create a safety hazard for drivers and anyone in their vicinity by causing distracted revulsion on the part of the driver. It also creates a safety hazard by causing the road surface to become slick with crushed crickets. The crickets can cause devastation to agriculture.

== Diet ==
The Mormon cricket shows a marked preference for forbs, but grasses and shrubs such as sagebrush are also consumed. Mormon crickets also eat insects, including other Mormon crickets, especially individuals that have been killed or injured by automobiles or insecticides. Cannibalistic behavior may be a result of protein and salt deficiency. Swarming behavior may in turn be a strategy to avoid predation by other Mormon crickets. A journal documenting an 1846 journey along the Oregon Trail describes an encounter with the crickets and notes their cannibalistic behavior:

The ground, for a strip of about four miles, was covered with black crickets of a large size. I saw some that were about three inches in length, and measuring about three-fourths of an inch in diameter; but the common size were two inches in length and one-half or five-eighths of an inch in diameter; their legs were large in proportion to the size of their bodies. Some were singing on stalks of wild sage; others crawling in every direction. Our teams made great havoc among them; so numerous were they that we crushed them at every step. As soon as one was killed, others of them would alight upon it and devour it.

== Control ==
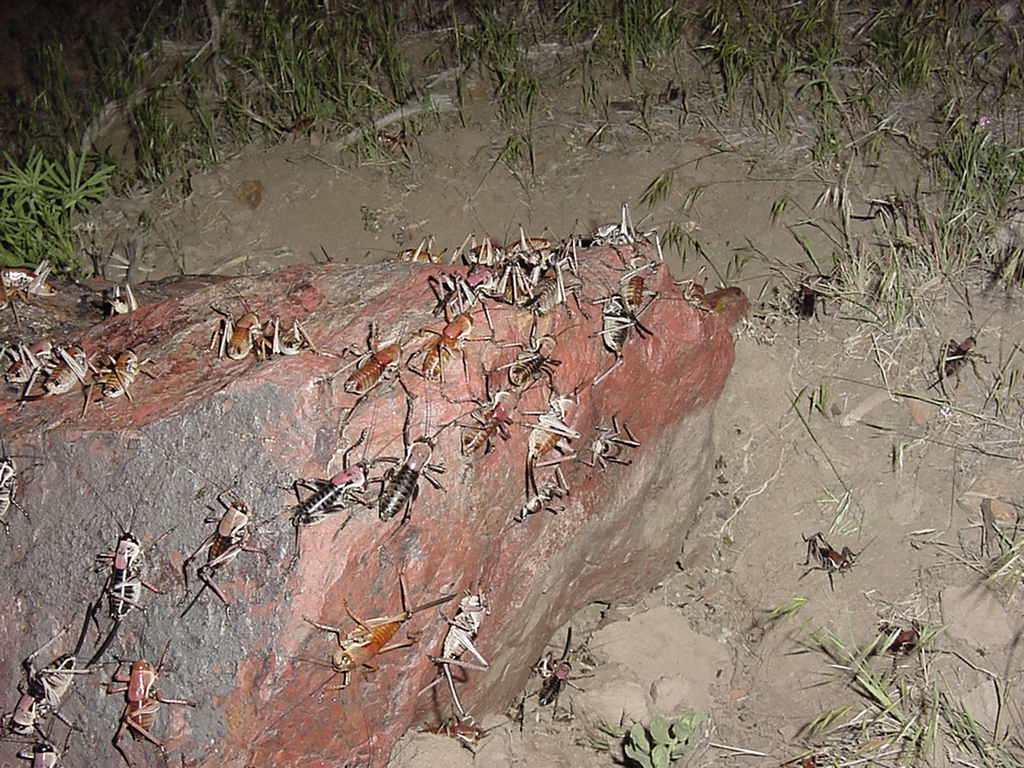
Multicolored swarm in Nevada, 2002

Mormon crickets are preyed upon by a wide variety of birds and mammals. These predators include California gulls, crows, coyotes, and various rodents. There are no predators that specialize on Mormon crickets, and this may be explained by the cricket's migratory habits and large population fluctuations. Gordius robustus, a species of horsehair worm, is a parasite of the Mormon cricket, as is Ooencyrtus anabrivorus.

The most common chemical control method used is carbaryl (typically sold as "Sevin Dust") bait. This bait kills both the Mormon crickets that eat the bait and the crickets that eat crickets that have eaten the bait. Insecticides applied directly to crops may kill the insects, but due to the large size of swarms, this method usually does not save the crop from being destroyed.

As Mormon crickets are flightless, physical barriers may be effective. Barriers should be at least two feet high and made of a smooth material. Residents of some small towns have used boom boxes and sound systems playing hard rock music in attempts to divert the moving swarms away from crops and houses.

Another method for the control of Mormon crickets is the use of a biopesticide based on the fungus Nosema locustae. N. locustae is a naturally occurring microbe the spores of which kill orthopterans by interfering with the digestive system. According to the U.S. Environmental Protection Agency, its use has no adverse effect on humans or the environment.

== Historical ==
Mormon crickets appear in some traditional Native American diets such as that of the Achomawi.

An infestation of Mormon crickets in the Salt Lake Valley the late 1840s decimated the crops of Latter-day Saint colonists in the area, which is why they are referred to as Mormon crickets. This is most famously recalled in the "Miracle of the gulls" story.

In 2003, officials in Utah, Idaho and Nevada said that year's infestation might be the worst in recent history.
